The following is the full list of the extant species in Class Chondrichthyes, or the cartilaginous fish. Members of this class have a backbone, gills, no swim bladder, jaws, and a skeleton made of cartilage, a soft, strong material as a replacement for bone.

Subclass Holocephali

Order Chimaeriformes
 Family Callorhinchidae Garman 1901 
 Genus Callorhinchus Lacépède 1798 (Plownose chimaera)
 Callorhinchus callorynchus Linnaeus 1758 (ploughnose chimaera)
 Callorhinchus capensis Duméril 1865 (Cape elephantfish)
 Callorhinchus milii Bory de Saint-Vincent 1823 (Australian ghost shark)
 Family Chimaeridae Bonaparte, 1831 (Shortnose chimaeras or ratfishes)
 Genus Chimaera Linnaeus 1758
 Chimaera argiloba Last, White & Pogonoski 2008 (whitefin chimaera)
 Chimaera bahamaensis Kemper, Ebert, Didier & Compagno 2010 (Bahamas ghost shark)
 Chimaera cubana Howell-Rivero 1936 (Cuban chimaera)
 Chimaera fulva Didier, Last & White 2008 (southern chimaera)
 Chimaera jordani Tanaka 1905 (Jordan's chimaera)
 Chimaera lignaria Didier 2002 (carpenter's chimaera)
 Chimaera macrospina Didier, Last & White 2008 (longspine chimaera)
 Chimaera monstrosa Linnaeus 1758 (rabbit fish)
 Chimaera notafricana Kemper, Ebert, Compagno & Didier 2010 (Cape chimaera)
 Chimaera obscura Didier, Last & White 2008 (shortspine chimaera)
 Chimaera opalescens Luchetti, Iglésias & Sellos 2011 (Opal chimaera)
 Chimaera orientatis Angulo, López, Bussing & Murase 2014 (Eastern Pacific black chimaera)
 Chimaera owstoni Tanaka 1905 (Owston's chimaera)
 Chimaera panthera Didier 1998 (leopard chimaera)
 Chimaera phantasma Jordan & Snyder 1900 (silver chimaera)
 Genus Hydrolagus Gill 1863
 Hydrolagus affinis de Brito Capello 1868 (smalleyed rabbitfish)
 Hydrolagus africanus Gilchrist 1922 (African chimaera)
 Hydrolagus alberti Bigelow & Schroeder 1951 (Gulf chimaera)
 Hydrolagus alphus Quaranta, Didier, Long & Ebert 2006
 Hydrolagus barbouri Garman 1908 (Ninespot chimaera)
 Hydrolagus bemisi Didier 2002 (pale ghost shark)
 Hydrolagus colliei Lay & Bennett 1839 (spotted ratfish)
 Hydrolagus deani Smith & Radcliffe 1912 (Philippine chimaera)
 Hydrolagus eidolon Jordan & Hubbs 1925
 Hydrolagus homonycteris Didier 2008 (black ghostshark)
 Hydrolagus lemures Whitley, 1939 (blackfin ghostshark)
 Hydrolagus lusitanicus Moura, Figueiredo, Bordalo-Machado, Almeida & Gordo 2005
 Hydrolagus macrophthalmus de Buen 1959 (Bigeye chimaera)
 Hydrolagus marmoratus Didier, 2008 (marbled ghostshark)
 Hydrolagus matallanasi Soto & Vooren 2004 (Brazilian striped rabbitfish)
 Hydrolagus mccoskeri Barnett, Didier, Long & Ebert 2006 (Galápagos ghostshark)
 Hydrolagus melanophasma James, Ebert, Long & Didier 2009 (Eastern Pacific black ghostshark)
 Hydrolagus mirabilis Collett 1904 (large-eyed rabbitfish)
 Hydrolagus mitsukurii Jordan & Snyder 1904 (spookfish)
 Hydrolagus novaezealandiae Fowler 1911 (dark ghostshark)
 Hydrolagus ogilbyi Waite 1898
 Hydrolagus pallidus Hardy & Stehmann 1990
 Hydrolagus purpurescens Gilbert 1905 (purple chimaera)
 Hydrolagus trolli Didier & Séret 2002 (pointy-nosed blue chimaera)
 Hydrolagus waitei Fowler 1907
 Family Rhinochimaeridae Garman 1901 (Longnose chimaeras)
 Genus Harriotta Goode & Bean 1895
 Harriotta haeckeli Karrer 1972 (smallspine spookfish)
 Harriotta raleighana Goode & Bean 1895 (Pacific longnose chimaera)
 Genus Neoharriotta Bigelow & Schroeder 1950 (sicklefin chimaera)
 Neoharriotta carri Bullis & Carpenter 1966 (dwarf sicklefin chimaera)
 Neoharriotta pinnata Schnakenbeck 1931 (sicklefin chimaera)
 Neoharriotta pumila Didier & Stehmann 1996 (Arabian sicklefin chimaera)
 Genus Rhinochimaera Garman 1901
 Rhinochimaera africana Compagno, Stehmann & Ebert 1990 (paddlenose chimaera)
 Rhinochimaera atlantica Holt & Byrne 1909 (straightnose rabbitfish)
 Rhinochimaera pacifica Mitsukuri 1895 (Pacific spookfish)

Subclass Elasmobranchii

Superorder Batoidea

Order Torpediniformes
 Suborder Platyrhinoidei
 Family Platyrhinidae Jordan 1923 (Thornbacks & fanrays)
 Genus Platyrhina Müller & Henle 1838 (Fanrays)
 Platyrhina hyugaensis Iwatsuki, Miyamoto & Nakaya 2011 (Hyuga fanray)
 Platyrhina sinensis Bloch & Schneider 1801 (common fanray)
 Platyrhina tangi Iwatsuki, Zhang & Nakaya 2011 (Yellow-spotted fanray)
 Genus Platyrhinoidis Garman 1881 
 Platyrhinoidis triseriata Jordan & Gilbert 1880 (Thornback guitarfish)
 Suborder Torpedinoidei
 Family Hypnidae Gill 1862
 Genus Hypnos Duméril 1852
 Hypnos monopterygium (Shaw 1795) (coffin ray)
 Family Torpedinidae Henle 1834 (electric rays)
 Genus Torpedo Houttuyn 1764 non Forsskål ex Niebuhr 1775
 Subgenus (Torpedo)
 Torpedo torpedo (Linnaeus 1758) (Common torpedo)
 Torpedo marmorata Risso 1810 (Marbled electric ray)
 Torpedo sinuspersici Olfers 1831 (Variable torpedo)
 Torpedo panthera Olfers 1831 (Leopard torpedo)
 Torpedo fuscomaculata Peters 1855 (Black-spotted torpedo)
 Torpedo suessi Steindachner 1898
 Torpedo zugmayeri (Engelhardt 1912)
 Torpedo mackayana Metzelaar 1919 (Ringed torpedo)
 Torpedo andersoni Bullis 1962 (Florida torpedo)
 Torpedo bauchotae Cadenat, Capapé & Desoutter 1978 (Rosette torpedo)
 Torpedo adenensis Carvalho, Stehmann & Manilo 2002 (Aden Gulf torpedo)
 Torpedo formosa Haas & Ebert 2006 (Taiwan torpedo)
 Subgenus (Tetronarce) Gill 1862
 Torpedo cowleyi (Ebert, Haas & de Carvalho 2015) (Cowley's torpedo ray)
 Torpedo nobiliana Bonaparte 1835 (Atlantic torpedo)
 Torpedo californica Ayres 1855 (Pacific electric ray)
 Torpedo fairchildi Hutton 1872 (New Zealand torpedo)
 Torpedo tokionis (Tanaka 1908) (Trapezoid torpedo)
 Torpedo puelcha Lahille 1926 (Argentine torpedo)
 Torpedo macneilli (Whitley 1932) (Shorttail torpedo)
 Torpedo tremens de Buen 1959 (Chilean torpedo)
 Torpedo peruana Chirichigno 1963
 Torpedo microdiscus Parin & Kotlyar 1985 (Smalldisk torpedo)
 Torpedo semipelagica Parin & Kotlyar 1985 (Semipelagic/Alexandrine torpedo)
 Family Narcinidae (Gill 1862) (numbfishes)
 Genus Benthobatis Alcock 1898
 Benthobatis moresbyi Alcock 1898 (Dark blind ray)
 Benthobatis marcida Bean & Weed 1909 (Blind torpedo)
 Benthobatis kreffti Rincón, Stehmann & Vooren 2001 (Brazilian blind electric ray)
 Benthobatis yangi Carvalho, Compagno & Ebert 2003 (Taiwanese blind electric ray)
 Genus Diplobatis Bigelow & Schroeder 1948
 Diplobatis ommata (Jordan & Gildert 1890) (Ocellated electric ray)
 Diplobatis guamachensis Martín Salazar 1957 (Brownband numbfish)
 Diplobatis colombiensis Fechhelm & McEachran 1984 (Colombian electric ray)
 Diplobatis pictus Palmer 1950 (Painted electric ray)
 Genus Discopyge Heckel ex Tschudi 1846
 Discopyge tschudii (Heckel 1845) (Apron ray)
 Discopyge castelloi Menni, Rincón & García 2008
 Genus Narcine Henle 1834
 Narcine baliensis de Carvalho & White 2016
 Narcine timlei (Bloch & Schneider 1801) (Spotted numbfish)
 ?Narcine bicolor (Shaw 1804)
 Narcine maculata (Shaw 1804) (Dark-finned numbfish)
 Narcine brasiliensis (Olfers 1831) (Brazilian electric ray)
 Narcine bancroftii (Griffith & Smith 1834) (Lesser electric ray)
 Narcine tasmaniensis Richardson 1840 (Tasmanian numbfish)
 Narcine lingula Richardson 1840 (Chinese numbfish)
 ?Narcine nigra Dumeril 1852
 Narcine entemedor Jordan & Starks 1895 (Giant electric ray)
 Narcine brunnea Annandale 1909 (Brown numbfish)
 Narcine vermiculata Breder 1928 (Vermiculate electric ray)
 Narcine prodorsalis Besednov 1966 (Tonkin numbfish)
 Narcine brevilabiata Besednov 1966 (Short-lip electric ray)
 Narcine westraliensis McKay 1966 (Banded numbfish)
 Narcine rierai (Lloris & Rucabado 1991) (Slender electric ray)
 Narcine leoparda Carvalho 2001 (Leopard electric ray)
 Narcine insolita Carvalho, Séret & Compagno 2002 (Madagascar numbfish)
 Narcine lasti Carvalho & Séret 2002 (Western numbfish)
 Narcine oculifera de Carvalho, Compagno & Mee 2002 (Big-eye electric ray)
 Narcine atzi Carvalho & Randall 2003 (Atz's numbfish)
 Narcine nelsoni Carvalho 2008 (Eastern numbfish)
 Narcine ornata Carvalho 2008 (Ornate numbfish)
 Family Narkidae Fowler 1934 (sleeper rays)
 Genus Crassinarke Takagi 1951
 Crassinarke dormitor Takagi 1951 (Sleeper torpedo)
 Genus Electrolux Compagno & Heemstra 2007
 Electrolux addisoni Compagno & Heemstra 2007 (Ornate sleeper-ray)
 Genus Heteronarce Regan 1921
 Heteronarce mollis (Lloyd 1907) (Soft electric ray)
 Heteronarce garmani Regan 1921 (Natal electric ray)
 Heteronarce prabhui Talwar 1981 (Quilon electric ray)
 Heteronarce bentuviai (Baranes & Randall 1989) (Elat electric ray)
 Genus Narke Kaup 1826
 Narke capensis (Gmelin 1789) (Onefin electric ray)
 Narke dipterygia (Bloch & Schneider 1801) (Numbray)
 Narke japonica (Schengel 1850) (Japanese sleeper ray)
 Genus Temera Gray 1831
 Temera hardwickii Gray 1831 (Finless sleeper ray)
 Genus Typhlonarke Waite 1909
 Typhlonarke aysoni (Hamilton 1902) (Blind electric ray)
 Typhlonarke tarakea Phillipps 1929 (Oval electric ray)

Order Rhinopristiformes
 Suborder Zanobatoidei
 Family Zanobatidae Fowler 1934 (Striped panray)
 Genus Zanobatus Garman 1913
 Zanobatus schoenleinii (Müller & Henle 1841) Garman 1913 (Striped panray)
 Suborder Pristoidei
 Family Trygonorrhinidae Last, Séret & Naylor 2016
 Genus Aptychotrema Norman 1926 (shovelnose rays)
 Aptychotrema rostrata (Shaw 1794) (Eastern shovelnose ray)
 Aptychotrema timorensis Last 2004 (Spotted shovelnose ray)
 Aptychotrema vincentiana (Haacke 1885) (Western shovelnose ray)
 Genus Trygonorrhina Müller & Henle 1838 (fiddler rays)
 Trygonorrhina dumerilii (Castelnau 1873) (Southern fiddler ray)
 Trygonorrhina fasciata (Müller & Henle 1841) (Eastern fiddler ray)
 Trygonorrhina melaleuca (Scott 1954)
 Genus Zapteryx Jordan & Gilbert 1880
 Zapteryx brevirostris (Müller & Henle 1841) (Lesser guitarfish)
 Zapteryx exasperata (Jordan & Gilbert 1880) (Banded guitarfish)
 Zapteryx xyster Jordan & Evermann 1896 (Witch guitarfish)
 Family Rhinobatidae Bonaparte 1835 (guitarfishes)
 Genus Pseudobatos Last et al. 2016
 Pseudobatos glaucostigmus (Jordan & Gilbert 1883) (Speckled guitarfish)
 Pseudobatos horkelii (Müller & Henle 1841) (Brazilian guitarfish)
 Pseudobatos lentiginosus (Garman 1880) (Atlantic guitarfish)
 Pseudobatos leucorhynchus (Günther 1867) (Whitesnout guitarfish)
 Pseudobatos percellens (Walbaum 1792) (Chola guitarfish)
 Pseudobatos planiceps (Garman 1880) (Pacific guitarfish)
 Pseudobatos prahli (Acero & Franke 1995) (Gorgona guitarfish)
 Pseudobatos productus (Ayres 1854) (Shovelnose guitarfish)
 Genus Tarsistes Jordan 1919
 Tarsistes philippii Jordan 1919
 Genus Acroteriobatus Giltay 1928
 Acroteriobatus annulatus (Müller & Henle 1841) (lesser guitarfish)
 Acroteriobatus blochii (Müller & Henle 1841) (Bluntnose guitarfish)
 Acroteriobatus leucospilus (Norman 1926) (Gray-spotted guitarfish)
 Acroteriobatus ocellatus (Norman 1926) (speckled guitarfish)
 Acroteriobatus omanensis Last et al. 2016
 Acroteriobatus salalah (Randall & Compagno 1995) (Salalah guitarfish)
 Acroteriobatus variegatus (Nair & Lal Mohan 1973) (Stripenose guitarfish)
 Acroteriobatus zanzibarensis (Norman 1926) (Zanzibar guitarfish)
 Genus Rhinobatos Linck 1790
 Rhinobatos albomaculatus Norman 1930 (White-spotted guitarfish)
 Rhinobatos annandalei Norman 1926 (Annandale's guitarfish)
 Rhinobatos borneensis Last, Séret & Naylor 2016
 Rhinobatos formosensis Norman 1926 (Taiwan guitarfish)
 Rhinobatos holcorhynchus Norman 1922 (Slender guitarfish)
 Rhinobatos hynnicephalus Richardson 1846 (Angel fish)
 Rhinobatos irvinei Norman 1931 (Spineback guitarfish)
 Rhinobatos jimbaranensis Last, White & Fahmi 2006 (Jimbaran shovelnose ray)
 Rhinobatos lionotus Norman 1926 (Smoothback guitarfish)
 Rhinobatos microphthalmus Teng 1959 (Small-eyed guitarfish)
 Rhinobatos manai White et al. 2016
 Rhinobatos nudidorsalis Last, Compagno & Nakaya 2004 (Bareback shovelnose ray)
 Rhinobatos penggali Last, White & Fahmi 2006 (Indonesian shovelnose ray)
 Rhinobatos petiti Chabanaud 1929 (Madagascar guitarfish)
 Rhinobatos punctifer Compagno & Randall 1987 (Spotted guitarfish)
 Rhinobatos rhinobatos (Linnaeus 1758) (Common guitarfish)
 Rhinobatos sainsburyi Last 2004 (Goldeneye shovelnose)
 Rhinobatos schlegelii Müller & Henle 1841 (Brown guitarfish)
 Rhinobatos spinosus Günther 1870 (Spiny guitarfish)
 Rhinobatos thouiniana (Shaw 1804) (Shaw's shovelnose guitar fish)
 Rhinobatos whitei Last, Corrigan & Naylor 2014 (Philippine guitarfish)
 Family Rhinidae Müller & Henle 1841
 Genus Rhynchorhina Séret & Naylor 2016
 Rhynchorhina mauritaniensis Séret & Naylor 2016
 Genus Rhina Bloch & Schneider 1801 
 Rhina ancylostoma Bloch & Schneider 1801 (Bowmouth guitarfish)
 Genus Rhynchobatus Müller & Henle 1837 (Wedgefishes)
 Rhynchobatus australiae Whitley 1939 (White-spotted wedgefish)
 Rhynchobatus djiddensis (Forsskål 1775) (Giant guitarfish)
 Rhynchobatus immaculatus Last, Ho & Chen 2013 (Taiwanese wedgefish)
 Rhynchobatus laevis (Bloch & Schneider 1801) (Smooth nose wedgefish)
 Rhynchobatus luebberti Ehrenbaum 1915 (African wedgefish)
 Rhynchobatus palpebratus Compagno & Last 2008 (Eyebrow wedgefish)
 Rhynchobatus springeri Compagno & Last 2010 (Broadnose wedgefish)
 Family Pristidae (Sawfish or carpenter sharks)
 Genus Anoxypristis White & Moy-Thomas 1941
 Anoxypristis cuspidata (Latham, 1794) White & Moy-Thomas 1941 (Knifetooth sawfish or pointed sawfish)
 Genus Pristis Linck 1790
 Pristis clavata Garman, 1906 (Queensland sawfish or dwarf sawfish)
 Pristis pectinata Latham, 1794 (Smalltooth sawfish)
 Pristis pristis (Linnaeus, 1758) (Common large-tooth sawfish)
 Pristis zijsron  Bleeker, 1851 (Longcomb sawfish)
 Family Glaucostegidae Last, Séret & Naylor 2016 (giant guitarfishes)
 Genus Glaucostegus Bonaparte 1846
 Glaucostegus cemiculus (Geoffroy St. Hilaire 1817) (Blackchin guitarfish)
 Glaucostegus granulatus Cuvier 1829 (Granulated guitarfish)
 Glaucostegus halavi (Forsskål 1775) (Halavi ray)
 Glaucostegus obtusus (Müller & Henle 1841) (Widenose guitarfish)
 Glaucostegus thouin Anonymous [Bennett] 1798 (Thouin ray)
 Glaucostegus typus (Bennett 1830) (Giant shovelnose ray)

Order Rajiformes
 Family Gurgesiellidae Buen 1959 (leg skates)
 Tribe Gurgesiellini
 Genus Gurgesiella de Buen 1959 (Small deep-water skates)
 Gurgesiella atlantica (Bigelow & Schroeder 1962) (Atlantic pygmy skate)
 Gurgesiella dorsalifera McEachran 1980 (Onefin skate)
 Gurgesiella furvescens de Buen 1959 (Dusky finless skate)
 Tribe Crurirajini
 Genus Cruriraja Bigelow & Schroeder 1948
 Cruriraja andamanica (Lloyd 1909) (Andaman leg skate)
 Cruriraja atlantis Bigelow & Schroeder 1948 (Atlantic leg skate)
 Cruriraja cadenati Bigelow & Schroeder 1962 (Broadfoot leg skate)
 Cruriraja durbanensis (von Bonde & Swart 1922) (Smoothnose leg skate)
 Cruriraja hulleyi Aschliman, Ebert & Compagno 2010
 Cruriraja parcomaculata (von Bonde & Swart 1922) (Roughnose leg skate)
 Cruriraja poeyi Bigelow & Schroeder 1948 (Cuban leg skate)
 Cruriraja rugosa Bigelow & Schroeder 1958 (Rough leg skate)
 Genus Fenestraja (McEachran & Compagno 1982) (Pygmy skates)
 Fenestraja atripinna (Bigelow & Schroeder 1950) (Blackfin pygmy skate)
 Fenestraja cubensis (Bigelow & Schroeder 1950) (Cuban pygmy skate)
 Fenestraja ishiyamai (Bigelow & Schroeder 1950) (Plain pygmy skate)
 Fenestraja maceachrani (Seret 1989) (Madagascar pygmy skate)
 Fenestraja mamillidens (Alcock 1889) (Prickly-skate|Prickly skate)
 Fenestraja plutonia (Garman 1881) (Pluto skate)
 Fenestraja sibogae (Weber 1913) (Siboga skate)
 Fenestraja sinusmexicanus (Bigelow & Schroeder 1950) (Gulf of Mexico pygmy skate)
 Family Anacanthobatidae (Smooth legskates)
 Genus Anacanthobatis von Bonde & Swart 1923
 Anacanthobatis americana Bigelow & Schroeder 1962 (American leg skate)
 Anacanthobatis donghaiensis (Deng, Xiong & Zhan 1983) (East China leg skate)
 Anacanthobatis folirostris (Bigelow & Schroeder 1951) (Leaf-nose leg skate)
 Anacanthobatis longirostris Bigelow & Schroeder 1962 (Longnose leg skate)
 Anacanthobatis marmorata (von Bonde & Swart 1923) (Spotted legskate)
 Anacanthobatis nanhaiensis (Meng & Li 1981) (South China leg skate)
 Genus Indobatis Weigmann, Stehmann & Thiel 2014
 Indobatis ori (Wallace 1967) Weigmann, Stehmann & Thiel 2014 (Black legskate)
 Genus Sinobatis (Hulley 1973) (Indopacific smooth skates)
 Sinobatis andamanensis Last & Bussarawit 2016
 Sinobatis borneensis (Chan 1965) (Borneo legskate)
 Sinobatis brevicauda Weigmann & Stehmann 2016 (Short-tail legskate)
 Sinobatis bulbicauda Last & Séret 2008 (Western Australian legskate)
 Sinobatis caerulea Last & Séret 2008 (Blue legskate)
 Sinobatis filicauda Last & Séret 2008 (Eastern Australian legskate)
 Sinobatis kotlyari Stehmann & Weigmann 2016
 Sinobatis melanosoma (Chan 1965) (Black-bodied legskate)
 Sinobatis stenosoma (Li & Hu 1982) (Narrow leg skate)
 Family Arhynchobatidae Fowler 1934 (longtail skates)
 Subfamily Riorajinae
 Genus Atlantoraja (Menni 1972) (Southern South American skates)
 Atlantoraja castelnaui (Ribeiro 1904) (Spotback skate)
 Atlantoraja cyclophora (Regan 1903) (Eyespot skate)
 Atlantoraja platana (Gunther 1880) (La Plata skate)
 Genus Rioraja (Müller & Henle 1841) Whitley 1939
 Rioraja agassizii (Müller & Henle 1841) Whitley 1939 (Rio skate)
 Subfamily Arhynchobatinae
 Tribe Arhynchobatini
 Genus Psammobatis Günther 1870 (Sand skates)
 Psammobatis bergi Marini 1932 (Blotched sand skate)
 Psammobatis extenta (Garman 1913) (Zipper sand skate)
 Psammobatis lentiginosa McEachran 1983 (Freckled sand skate)
 Psammobatis normani McEachran 1983 (Shortfin sand skate)
 Psammobatis parvacauda McEachran 1983 (Smalltail sand skate)
 Psammobatis rudis Gunther 1870 (Smallthorn sand skate)
 Psammobatis rutra Jordan 1890 (Spade sand skate)
 Psammobatis scobina (Phillipi 1857) (Raspthorn sand skate)
 Genus Sympterygia Müller & Henle 1837 (fanskates)
 Sympterygia lima (Poeppig 1835) (Filetail fanskate)
 Sympterygia bonapartei Müller & Henle 1841 (Smallnose fanskate)
 Sympterygia acuta Garman 1877 (Bignose fanskate)
 Sympterygia brevicaudata (Cope 1877) (Shorttail fanskate)
 Genus Arhynchobatis Waite 1909 (Longtail skate)
 Arhynchobatis asperrima Waite 1909 (Longtail skate)
 Genus Irolita Whitley 1931 (Round skates)
 Irolita waitii (McCulloch 1911) (Southern round skate)
 Irolita westraliensis Last & Gledhill 2008 (Western round skate)
 Tribe Bathyrajini Last, Weigmann & Yang 2016
 Genus Bathyraja (Ishiyama 1958)
 Bathyraja abyssicola  (Deepsea skate)
 Bathyraja aguja (Aguja skate)
 Bathyraja albomaculata (White-dotted skate)
 Bathyraja aleutica (Aleutian skate)
 Bathyraja andriashevi (Little-eyed skate)
 Bathyraja bergi (Bottom skate)
 Bathyraja brachyurops (Broadnose skate)
 Bathyraja caeluronigricans (Purple-black skate)
 Bathyraja cousseauae (Joined-fins skate)
 Bathyraja dilpotaenia (Dusty-pink skate)
 Bathyraja eatonii (Eaton's skate)
 Bathyraja fedorovi (Cinnamon skate)
 Bathyraja griseocauda (Graytail skate)
 Bathyraja hesperafricana (West African skate)
 Bathyraja interrupta (Sandpaper skate)
 Bathyraja irrasa (Kerguelen sandpaper skate)
 Bathyraja ishiharai
 Bathyraja isotrachys (Raspback skate)
 Bathyraja leucomelanos (Domino skate)
 Bathyraja lindbergi (Commander skate)
 Bathyraja longicauda (Slimtail skate)
 Bathyraja maccaini (McCain's skate)
 Bathyraja macloviana (Patagonian skate)
 Bathyraja maculata (White-blotched skate)
 Bathyraja magellanica (Magellan skate)
 Bathyraja mariposa (Butterfly skate)
 Bathyraja matsubarai (Dusky-purple skate)
 Bathyraja meridionalis (Dark-belly skate)
 Bathyraja murrayi (Smallthorn skate)
 Bathyraja multispinis (Multispine skate)
 Bathyraja notoroensis (Notoro skate)
 Bathyraja pallida (Pale skate)
 Bathyraja panthera (Leopard skate)
 Bathyraja papilionifera
 Bathyraja parmifera (Alaska skate)
 Bathyraja peruana (Peruvian skate)
 Bathyraja richardsoni (Richardson's ray)
 Bathyraja scaphiops (Cuphead skate)
 Bathyraja schroederi (Whitemouth skate)
 Bathyraja shuntovi (Longnose deep-sea skate)
 Bathyraja simoterus (Hokkaido skate)
 Bathyraja smirnovi (Golden skate)
 Bathyraja smithii (African softnose skate)
 Bathyraja spinicauda (Spinytail skate)
 Bathyraja spinosissima (Pacific white skate)
 Bathyraja trachouros (Eremo skate)
 Bathyraja taranetzi
 Bathyraja trachura (Roughtail skate)
 Bathyraja tunae
 Bathyraja tzinovskii (Creamback skate)
 Bathyraja violacea (Okhotsk skate)
 Genus Rhinoraja Ishiyama 1952 (jointnose skates)
 Rhinoraja kujiensis (Tanaka 1916) (Dapple-bellied softnose skate)
 Rhinoraja longicauda Ishiyama 1952 (White-bellied softnose skate)
 Rhinoraja odai Ishiyama 1958 (Oda's skate)
 Tribe Pavorajini McEachran 1984
 Genus Brochiraja Last & McEachran 2006 (Deep-sea skates)
 Brochiraja aenigma (Enigma skate)
 Brochiraja albilabiata
 Brochiraja asperula (Spiny deepsea skate)
 Brochiraja heuresa
 Brochiraja leviveneta
 Brochiraja microspinifera
 Brochiraja spinifera (Prickly deepsea skate)
 Brochiraja vittacauda
 Genus Insentiraja (Yearsley & Last 1992) (Pacific looseskin skates)
 Insentiraja laxipella (Eastern looseskin skate)
 Insentiraja subtilispinosa (Velvet skate)
 Genus Notoraja (Ishiyama 1958) (Indian/Pacific softnose skates)
 Notoraja alisae (Alis skate)
 Notoraja azurea (Blue-skate)
 Notoraja fijiensis (Fiji skate)
 Notoraja hirticauda (False ghost skate)
 Notoraja inusitata (Strange skate)
 Notoraja lira (Broken Ridge skate)
 Notoraja longiventralis (Long-ventral skate)
 Notoraja martinezi (Barbedwire-tailed skate)
 Notoraja ochroderma (Pale skate)
 Notoraja sapphira (Sapphire skate)
 Notoraja sticta (Blotched skate)
 Notoraja tobitukai (Lead-hued skate)
 Genus Pavoraja Whitley 1939 (Peacock skates)
 Pavoraja alleni (Allen's skate)
 Pavoraja arenaria (Sandy skate)
 Pavoraja mosaica (Mosaic skate)
 Pavoraja nitida (Peacock skate)
 Pavoraja pseudonitida (False peacock skate)
 Pavoraja umbrosa (Dusky skate)
 Genus Pseudoraja Bigelow & Schroeder 1954
 Pseudoraja atlantica
 Pseudoraja fischeri (Fanfin skate)
 Family Rajidae: "True" skates
 Genus Malacobatis Gratzianov 1907
 Malacobatis mucosa (Steller 1814) Gratzianov 1907 
 Tribe Rostrorajini Ishihara et al. 2012
 Genus Malacoraja (Stehmann 1970) (Soft skates)
 Malacoraja kreffti (Krefft's skate)
 Malacoraja obscura (Brazilian soft skate)
 Malacoraja senta
 Malacoraja spinacidermis (Soft skate)
 Genus Neoraja McEachran & Campagno 1982 (Blue pygmy skates)
 Neoraja africana (West African pygmy skate)
 Neoraja caerulea (Blue pygmy skate)
 Neoraja carolinensis (Carolina pygmy skate)
 Neoraja iberica (Iberian pygmy skate)
 Neoraja stehmanni (African dwarf skate)
 Genus Orbiraja Last, Weigman & Dumale 2016
 Orbiraja jensenae (Last & Lim 2010) Last, Weigmann & Dumale 2016 (Sulu sea skate)
 Orbiraja philipi (Lloyd 1906)
 Orbiraja powelli (Alcock 1898) (Indian ringed skate)
 Genus Rostroraja (Hulley 1972)
 Rostroraja ackleyi (Garman 1881) (Ocellate skate)
 Rostroraja alba (Lacépède 1802) Hulley 1972 (Bottlenose skate)
 Rostroraja bahamensis (Bigelow & Schroeder 1965) (Bahama skate)
 Rostroraja cervigoni (Bigelow & Schroeder 1964) (Finspot ray)
 Rostroraja eglanteria (Bosc 1800) (clearnose skate)
 Rostroraja equatorialis (Jordan & Bollman 1890) (equatorial ray)
 Rostroraja texana (Chandler 1921) (Roundel skate)
 Rostroraja velezi (Chirichigno 1973) (Velez ray)
 Tribe Amblyrajini McEachran & Dunn 1998
 Genus Amblyraja Malm 1877 (Thorny skates and others)
 Amblyraja badia (Broad skate)
 Amblyraja doellojuradoi (Southern thorny skate)
 Amblyraja frerichsi (Thickbody skate)
 Amblyraja georgiana (Antarctic starry skate)
 Amblyraja hyperborea (Arctic skate)
 Amblyraja jenseni (Jensen's skate or shorttail skate)
 Amblyraja radiata (Thorny skate)
 Amblyraja reversa (Reversed skate)
 Amblyraja robertsi (Bigmouth skate)
 Amblyraja taaf (Whiteleg skate)
 Genus Breviraja Bigelow & Schroeder 1948
 Breviraja claramaculata (Brightspot skate)
 Breviraja colesi (Lightnose skate)
 Breviraja mouldi (Blacknose skate)
 Breviraja nigriventralis (Blackbelly skate)
 Breviraja spinosa (Spinose skate)
 Genus Dactylobatus Bean & Weed 1909 (Skilletskate and hookskate)
 Dactylobatus armatus (Skilletskate)
 Dactylobatus clarkii (Hookskate)
 Genus Leucoraja Malm 1877 (Rough skates)
 Leucoraja caribbaea (Maya skate)
 Leucoraja circularis (Sandy skate)
 Leucoraja compagnoi (Tigertail skate)
 Leucoraja erinacea (Little skate)
 Leucoraja fullonica (Shagreen skate)
 Leucoraja garmani (Freckled skate)
 Leucoraja lentiginosa (Speckled skate)
 Leucoraja leucosticta (Whitedappled skate)
 Leucoraja melitensis (Maltese skate)
 Leucoraja naevus (Cuckoo skate)
 Leucoraja ocellata (Winter skate)
 Leucoraja pristispina (Sawback skate)
 Leucoraja virginica (Virginia skate)
 Leucoraja wallacei (Yellow-spotted skate)
 Leucoraja yucatanensis (Yucatan skate)
 Genus Rajella (Stehmann 1972)
 Rajella fyllae (Lütken 1887) (Nova Scotia/round ray)
 Rajella lintea (Fries 1838) (Sailray)
 Rajella bathyphila (Holt & Byrne 1908) (Deep-water ray)
 Rajella annandalei (Weber 1913) (Annandale's skate)
 Rajella caudaspinosa (von Bonde & Swart 1923) (Munchkin skate)
 Rajella leoparda (von Bonde & Swart 1923) (Leopard skate)
 Rajella barnardi (Norman 1935) (Bigthorn skate)
 Rajella fuliginea (Bigelow & Schroeder 1954) (Sooty skate)
 Rajella nigerrima (de Buen 1960) (Blackish skate)
 Rajella purpuriventralis (Bigelow & Schroeder 1962) (Purplebelly skate)
 Rajella dissimilis (Hulley 1970) (Ghost skate)
 Rajella ravidula (Hulley 1970) (Smoothback skate)
 Rajella sadowskii (Krefft & Stehmann 1974) (Brazilian skate)
 Rajella bigelowi (Stehmann 1978) (Bigelow's ray)
 Rajella kukujevi (Dolganov 1985) (Mid-Atlantic Skate)
 Rajella eisenhardti Long & McCosker 1999 (Galápagos grey skate)
 Rajella challengeri Last & Stehmann 2008 (Challenger Skate)
 Rajella paucispinosa Weigmann, Stehmann & Thiel 2014 (Sparsely-thorned skate)
 Tribe Rajini 
 Genus Dentiraja
 Dentiraja australis (Sydney skate)
 Dentiraja cerva (White-spotted skate)
 Dentiraja confusus (Longnose skate - this common name is also sometimes used for Beringraja rhina)
 Dentiraja endeavouri (Endeavour skate)
 Dentiraja falloargus (False Argus skate)
 Dentiraja flindersi (Pygmy thornback skate)
 Dentiraja healdi (Heald's skate)
 Dentiraja lemprieri (Thornback skate)
 Dentiraja oculus (Ocellate skate)
 Dentiraja polyommata (Argus skate)
 Genus Dipturus (Larger common skates)
 Dipturus acrobelus (Deepwater skate)
 Dipturus amphispinus (Ridgeback skate)
 Dipturus apricus (Pale tropical skate)
 Dipturus batis (Common skate, or blue skate)
 Dipturus bullisi (Bullis skate)
 Dipturus campbelli (Blackspot skate)
 Dipturus canutus (Gray skate)
 Dipturus crosnieri (Madagascar skate)
 Dipturus diehli (Thorny-tail skate)
 Dipturus doutrei (Violet skate)
 Dipturus ecuadoriensis (Ecuador skate)
 Dipturus flavirostris
 Dipturus garricki (San Blas skate)
 Dipturus gigas (Giant skate)
 Dipturus grahami (Graham's skate)
 Dipturus gudgeri (Greenback skate)
 Dipturus innominatus (New Zealand smooth skate)
 Dipturus johannisdavisi (Travancore skate)
 Dipturus kwangtungensis (Kwangtung skate)
 Dipturus laevis (Barndoor skate)
 Dipturus lanceorostratus (Rattail skate)
 Dipturus leptocauda (Thintail skate)
 Dipturus macrocauda (Bigtail skate)
 Dipturus melanospilus (Blacktip skate)
 Dipturus mennii (South Brazilian skate)
 Dipturus nidarosiensis (Norwegian skate)
 Dipturus olseni (Spreadfin skate)
 Dipturus oregoni (Hooktail skate)
 Dipturus oxyrinchus
 Dipturus pullopunctatus (Slimeskate)
 Dipturus queenslandicus (Queensland deepwater skate)
 Dipturus springeri (Roughbelly skate)
 Dipturus stenorhynchus (Prownose skate)
 Dipturus teevani (Prickly brown ray)
 Dipturus tengu (Acutenose skate)
 Dipturus trachyderma (Roughskin skate)
 Dipturus wengi (Weng's skate)
 Dipturus whitleyi (Wedgenose skate)
 Dipturus wuhanlingi (Wu's skate)
 Genus Beringraja Ishihara et al. 2012 [Raja “North Pacific Assemblage”]
 Beringraja binoculata (Girard 1855) (Big skate)
 Beringraja pulchra (Liu 1932) (Mottled skate)
 Beringraja corteziensis (McEachran & Miyake 1988)
 Beringraja inornata (Jordan & Gilbert 1880)
 Beringraja rhina (Jordan & Gilbert 1880) (Longnose skate this common name is also sometimes used for Dentiraja confusus)
 Beringraja stellulata (Jordan & Gilbert 1880)
 Genus Hongeo
 Hongeo koreana (Korean skate)
 Genus Okamejei (includes spot skates)
 Okamejei acutispina (Sharpspine skate)
 Okamejei arafurensis (Arafura skate)
 Okamejei boesemani (Boeseman's skate)
 Okamejei cairae (Borneo sand skate)
 Okamejei heemstrai (East African skate)
 Okamejei hollandi (Yellow-spotted skate)
 Okamejei kenojei (Ocellate spot skate, or spiny rasp skate)
 Okamejei leptoura (Thin-tail skate)
 Okamejei meerdervoortii (Bigeye skate)
 Okamejei mengae
 Okamejei ornata (Ornate skate)
 Okamejei pita (Pita skate)
 Okamejei schmidti (Browneye skate)
 Genus Raja
 Raja africana Capapé, 1977 (African skate)
 Raja asterias Delaroche, 1809 (Mediterranean starry ray)
 Raja brachyura Lafont, 1873 (blonde ray)
 Raja clavata Linnaeus, 1758 (thornback ray)
 Raja herwigi G. Krefft, 1965 (Cape Verde skate)
 Raja maderensis R. T. Lowe, 1838 (Madeiran ray)
 Raja microocellata Montagu, 1818 (small-eyed ray)
 Raja miraletus Linnaeus, 1758 (brown ray)
 Raja montagui Fowler, 1910 (spotted ray)
 Raja parva Last & Séret, 2016 (African brown skate)
 Raja polystigma Regan, 1923 (speckled ray)
 Raja radula Delaroche, 1809 (rough ray)
 Raja rondeleti Bougis, 1959 (Rondelet's ray)
 Raja rouxi Capapé, 1977
 Raja straeleni Poll, 1951 (spotted skate)
 Raja undulata Lacépède, 1802 (undulate ray)
 Genus Zearaja Whitley 1939
 Zearaja argentinensis (Díaz de Astarloa et al. 2008) (Argentine skate)
 Zearaja nasuta (Müller & Henle 1841) (New Zealand rough skate)
 Zearaja maugeana Last & Gledhill 2007 (Maugean skate)

Order Myliobatiformes
 Suborder Myliobatoidei: Stingrays, eagle rays, cownose rays, and butterfly rays
 Family Dasyatidae: Whiptail stingrays
 Genus Dasyatis: Rough stingrays
 Dasyatis acutirostra (Sharpnose stingray)
 Dasyatis akajei (Red stingray)
 Dasyatis americana (Southern stingray)
 Dasyatis bennetti (Bennett's stingray)
 Dasyatis brevicaudata (Short-tail stingray)
 Dasyatis centroura (Roughtail stingray)
 Dasyatis chrysonota (Blue stingray) 
 Dasyatis colarensis (Colares stingray)
 Dasyatis dipterura (Diamond stingray)
 Dasyatis fluviorum (Estuary stingray)
 Dasyatis garouaensis (Smooth freshwater stingray) 
 Dasyatis geijskesi (Sharpsnout stingray) 
 Dasyatis gigantea (Giant stumptail stingray)
 Dasyatis guttata (Longnose stingray) 
 Dasyatis hastata (Pygmy roughtail stingray) 
 Dasyatis hypostigma (Groovebelly stingray) 
 Dasyatis izuensis (Izu stingray) 
 Dasyatis kuhlii (Bluespotted stingray)
 Dasyatis laevigata (Yantai stingray)
 Dasyatis laosensis (Mekong freshwater stingray) 
 Dasyatis lata (Broad stingray)
 Dasyatis longa (Longtail stingray)
 Dasyatis longicauda (Merauke stingray) 
 Dasyatis margarita (Daisy stingray) 
 Dasyatis margaritella (Pearl stingray) 
 Dasyatis marianae (Brazilian large-eyed stingray) 
 Dasyatis marmorata (Marbled stingray)
 Dasyatis matsubarai (Pitted stingray)
 Dasyatis microps (Smalleye stingray)
 Dasyatis multispinosa (Multispine giant stingray)
 Dasyatis navarrae (Blackish stingray)
 Dasyatis parvonigra (Dwarf black stingray)
 Dasyatis pastinaca (Common stingray)
 Dasyatis rudis (Smalltooth stingray) 
 Dasyatis sabina (Atlantic stingray)
 Dasyatis say (Bluntnose stingray) 
 Dasyatis sinensis (Chinese stingray) 
 Dasyatis thetidis (Black stingray)
 Dasyatis tortonesei (Tortonese's stingray)
 Dasyatis ukpam (Pincushion ray) 
 Dasyatis ushiei (Cow stingray)
 Dasyatis zugei (Pale-edged stingray)
 Genus Himantura: Whiprays
 Himantura astra (Black-spotted whipray) 
 Himantura dalyensis (Freshwater whipray)
 Himantura fai (Pink whipray)
 Himantura gerrardi (Whitespotted whipray)
 Himantura granulata (Mangrove whipray)
 Himantura hortlei (Hortle's whipray) 
 Himantura imbricata (Scaly whipray)
 Himantura javaensis (Javan whipray) 
 Himantura jenkinsii (Jenkins' whipray)
 Himantura kittipongi (Roughback whipray)
 Himantura leoparda (Leopard whipray) 
 Himantura lobistoma (Tubemouth whipray)
 Himantura marginata (Blackedge whipray)
 Himantura microphthalma (Smalleye whipray)
 Himantura oxyrhyncha (Marbled whipray)
 Himantura pacifica (Pacific chupare, or Pacific whiptail stingray)
 Himantura pastinacoides (Round whipray)
 Himantura polylepis (Giant freshwater stingray)
 Himantura randalli (Arabian banded whipray)
 Himantura schmardae (Chupare stingray)
 Himantura signifer (White-edge freshwater whipray)
 Himantura toshi (Brown whipray) 
 Himantura tutul (Fine-spotted leopard whipray)
 Himantura uarnacoides (Whitenose whipray)
 Himantura uarnak (Reticulate whipray)
 Himantura undulata (Honeycomb whipray)
 Himantura walga (Dwarf whipray)
 Genus Makararaja
 Makararaja chindwinensis
 Genus Neotrygon: Maskrays 
 Neotrygon annotata (Plain maskray)
 Neotrygon leylandi (Painted maskray)
 Neotrygon ningalooensis (Ningaloo maskray)
 Neotrygon picta (Peppered maskray)
 Neotrygon trigonoides (New Caledonian maskray)
 Genus Pastinachus: Cowtail stingrays
 Pastinachus atrus (Eastern cowtail stingray)
 Pastinachus gracilicaudus (Narrowtail stingray)
 Pastinachus sephen (Cowtail stingray)
 Pastinachus solocirostris (Roughnose stingray)
 Genus Pteroplatytrygon: Pelagic stingray
 Pteroplatytrygon violacea (Pelagic stingray)
 Genus Taeniura: Ribbontail stingrays
 Taeniura grabata (Round fantail stingray)
 Taeniura lymma (Bluespotted ribbontail ray)
 Taeniura meyeni (Round ribbontail ray)
 Genus Urogymnus: Porcupine ray
 Urogymnus asperrimus (Porcupine ray)
 Family Gymnuridae: Butterfly rays 
 Genus Gymnura: Butterfly rays 
 Gymnura afuerae (Peruvian butterfly ray)
 Gymnura altavela (Spiny butterfly ray)
 Gymnura australis (Australian butterfly ray)
 Gymnura bimaculata (Twin-spot butterfly ray)
 Gymnura crebripunctata (Longspout butterfly ray)
 Gymnura crooki 
 Gymnura hirrundo (Madeira butterfly ray)
 Gymnura japonica (Japanese butterfly ray)
 Gymnura marmorata (California butterfly ray)
 Gymnura micrura (Smooth butterfly ray)
 Gymnura natalensis (Backwater butterfly ray)
 Gymnura poecilura (Longtail butterfly ray)
 Gymnura tentaculata (Tentacled butterfly ray)
 Gymnura zonura (Zonetail butterfly ray)
 Family Hexatrygonidae: Sixgill stingray 
 Genus Hexatrygon
 Hexatrygon bickelli (Sixgill stingray) 
 Family Myliobatidae: Eagle rays and manta rays 
 Genus Aetobatus
 Aetobatus flagellum (Longheaded eagle ray) 
 Aetobatus narinari (Spotted eagle ray)
 Aetobatus narutobiei (Naru eagle ray)
 Aetobatus ocellatus (Ocellated eagle ray)
 Genus Aetomylaeus: Stingless eagle rays
 Aetomylaeus asperrimus (Rough eagle ray)  
 Aetomylaeus bovinus (Bull ray)
 Aetomylaeus caeruleofasciatus
 Aetomylaeus maculatus (Mottled eagle ray)  
 Aetomylaeus milvus (Brown eagle ray)
 Aetomylaeus nichofii (Banded eagle ray)
 Aetomylaeus vespertilio (Ornate eagle ray)
 Genus Manta: Manta rays 
 Manta alfredi (Reef manta ray)
 Manta birostris (Giant oceanic manta ray)
 Genus Mobula: Devil rays 
 Mobula eregoodootenkee (Pygmy devil ray)
 Mobula hypostoma (Lesser devil ray)
 Mobula japanica (Spinetail mobula)
 Mobula kuhlii (Shortfin devil ray)
 Mobula mobular (Devil fish)
 Mobula munkiana (Monk's devil ray)
 Mobula rochebrunei (Guinean devil ray)
 Mobula tarapacana (Box ray)
 Mobula thurstoni (Bentfin devil ray)
 Genus Myliobatis: Eagle rays (in part)
 Myliobatis aquila (Common eagle ray)
 Myliobatis australis (Australian bull ray)
 Myliobatis californica (Bat ray)
 Myliobatis chilensis (Chilean eagle ray)
 Myliobatis freminvillei (Bullnose ray)
 Myliobatis goodei (Southern eagle ray)
 Myliobatis hamlyni (Purple eagle ray)
 Myliobatis longirostris (Longnose eagle ray, or snouted eagle ray)
 Myliobatis peruvianus (Peruvian eagle ray)
 Myliobatis ridens (Shortnose eagle ray)
 Myliobatis tenuicaudatus (New Zealand eagle ray)
 Myliobatis tobijei (Japanese eagle ray) 
 Family Plesiobatidae: Deepwater stingray
 Genus Plesiobatis 
 Plesiobatis daviesi (Deepwater stingray) 
 Family Potamotrygonidae: Freshwater stingrays 
 Genus Heliotrygon: Round river stingrays
 Heliotrygon gomesi (Gomes's round ray)
 Heliotrygon rosai (Rosa's round ray)
 Genus Paratrygon
 Paratrygon aiereba (Discus ray)
 Genus Plesiotrygon: Antenna rays 
 Plesiotrygon iwamae (Long-tailed river stingray)
 Plesiotrygon nana (Black-tailed antenna ray)
 Genus Potamotrygon: Common river stingrays 
 Potamotrygon amandae 
 Potamotrygon boesemani (Emperor ray)
 Potamotrygon brachyura (Short-tailed river stingray)
 Potamotrygon constellata (Thorny river stingray)
 Potamotrygon falkneri (Largespot river stingray)
 Potamotrygon henlei (Bigtooth river stingray)
 Potamotrygon humerosa
 Potamotrygon hystrix (Porcupine river stingray)
 Potamotrygon leopoldi (Xingu River ray, or white-blotched river stingray)
 Potamotrygon limai
 Potamotrygon magdalenae (Magdalena river stingray)
 Potamotrygon marinae
 Potamotrygon motoro (Ocellate river stingray)
 Potamotrygon ocellata (Red-blotched river stingray)
 Potamotrygon orbignyi (Smooth back river stingray)
 Potamotrygon pantanensis
 Potamotrygon schroederi (Rosette river stingray)
 Potamotrygon schuhmacheri (Parana River stingray)
 Potamotrygon scobina (Raspy river stingray)
 Potamotrygon signata (Parnaiba river stingray)
 Potamotrygon tatianae (Tatiana's river stingray)
 Potamotrygon tigrina (Tiger ray)
 Potamotrygon yepezi (Maracaibo River ray)
 Family Rhinopteridae: Cownose rays
 Genus Rhinoptera: Cownose rays
 Rhinoptera adspersa (Rough cownose ray)
 Rhinoptera bonasus (Common cownose ray)
 Rhinoptera brasiliensis (Brazilian cownose ray)
 Rhinoptera javanica (Flapnose ray)
 Rhinoptera jayakari (Oman cownose ray)
 Rhinoptera marginata (Lusitanian cownose ray)
 Rhinoptera neglecta (Australian cownose ray)
 Rhinoptera steindachneri (Pacific cownose ray)
 Family Urolophidae: Stingarees  
 Genus Trygonoptera: Australian stingarees 
 Trygonoptera galba (Yellow shovelnose stingaree)
 Trygonoptera imitata (Eastern shovelnose stingaree)
 Trygonoptera mucosa (Western shovelnose stingaree)
 Trygonoptera ovalis (Striped stingaree)
 Trygonoptera personata (Masked stingaree) 
 Trygonoptera testacea (Common stingaree)
 Genus Urolophus: Western Pacific stingarees 
 Urolophus armatus (New Ireland stingaree) 
 Urolophus aurantiacus (Sepia stingaree)
 Urolophus bucculentus (Sandyback stingaree)
 Urolophus circularis (Circular stingaree)
 Urolophus cruciatus (Crossback stingaree)
 Urolophus deforgesi (Chesterfield Island stingaree)
 Urolophus expansus (Wide stingaree)
 Urolophus flavomosaicus (Patchwork stingaree)
 Urolophus gigas (Spotted stingaree)
 Urolophus javanicus (Java stingaree)
 Urolophus kaianus (Kai stingaree)
 Urolophus kapalensis (Kapala stingaree)
 Urolophus lobatus (Lobed stingaree)
 Urolophus mitosis (Mitotic stingaree)
 Urolophus neocaledoniensis (New Caledonian stingaree)
 Urolophus orarius (Coastal stingaree)
 Urolophus papilio (Butterfly stingaree)
 Urolophus paucimaculatus (Sparsely-spotted stingaree)
 Urolophus piperatus (Coral sea stingaree)
 Urolophus sufflavus (Yellowback stingaree)
 Urolophus viridis (Greenback stingaree)
 Urolophus westraliensis (Brown stingaree)
 Family Urotrygonidae: American round stingrays 
 Genus Urobatis: Round stingrays
 Urobatis concentricus (Bullseye round stingray)
 Urobatis halleri (Round stingray)
 Urobatis jamaicensis (Yellow stingray)
 Urobatis maculatus (Spotted round ray) 
 Urobatis marmoratus (Chilean round stingray)
 Urobatis pardalis (Leopard round stingray)
 Urobatis tumbesensis (Tumbes round stingray)
 Genus Urotrygon: American round stingrays
 Urotrygon aspidura (Spiny-tail round ray)
 Urotrygon caudispinosus (Spine-tailed round ray)
 Urotrygon chilensis (Chilean round ray)
 Urotrygon cimar (Denticled stingray)
 Urotrygon microphthalmum (Smalleyed round stingray)
 Urotrygon munda (Munda round ray)
 Urotrygon nana (Dwarf round ray)
 Urotrygon peruanus (Peruvian stingray)
 Urotrygon reticulata (Reticulate round ray)
 Urotrygon rogersi (Roger's round ray)
 Urotrygon serrula (Saw-spined round ray)
 Urotrygon simulatrix (Fake round ray)
 Urotrygon venezuelae (Venezuela round stingray)

Superorder Squalomorphii

Order Hexanchiformes
 Family Chlamydoselachidae Garman 1884 (frilled sharks)
 Genus: Chlamydoselachus Garman, 1884
 Chlamydoselachus africana Ebert & Compagno, 2009 (Southern African frilled shark)
 Chlamydoselachus anguineus Garman, 1884 (Frilled shark)
Family Hexanchidae J. E. Gray 1851 (Cow sharks)
 Genus: Heptranchias Rafinesque, 1810
 Heptranchias perlo (Bonnaterre, 1788) (sharpnose sevengill shark)
 Genus: Hexanchus Rafinesque, 1810
 Hexanchus griseus  (Bonnaterre, 1788) (bluntnose sixgill shark)
 Hexanchus nakamurai Teng, 1962 (bigeyed sixgill shark)
 Genus: Notorynchus Ayres, 1855
 Notorynchus cepedianus  (Péron, 1807) (broadnose sevengill shark)

Order Squaliformes
 Family Centrophoridae Bleeker 1859 (gulper sharks)
 Genus Centrophorus J. P. Müller & Henle, 1837
 Centrophorus atromarginatus Garman, 1913 (Dwarf gulper shark)
 Centrophorus granulosus (Bloch & J. G. Schneider, 1801) (Gulper shark)
 Centrophorus harrissoni McCulloch, 1915 (Dumb gulper shark)
 Centrophorus isodon (Y. T. Chu, Q. W. Meng & J. X. Liu, 1981) (Black-fin gulper shark)
 Centrophorus lusitanicus Barbosa du Bocage & Brito Capello, 1864 (Low-fin gulper shark)
 Centrophorus moluccensis Bleeker, 1860 (Small-fin gulper shark)
 Centrophorus seychellorum Baranes, 2003 (Seychelles gulper shark)
 Centrophorus squamosus (Bonnaterre, 1788) (Leaf-scale gulper shark)
 Centrophorus tessellatus Garman, 1906 (Mosaic gulper shark)
 Centrophorus uyato (Rafinesque, 1810) (Little gulper shark)
 Centrophorus westraliensis W. T. White, Ebert & L. J. V. Compagno, 2008 (Western gulper shark)
 Centrophorus zeehaani W. T. White, Ebert & L. J. V. Compagno, 2008 (Southern dogfish)
 Centrophorus sp. A Not yet described (Mini gulper shark)
 Centrophorus sp. B Not yet described (Slender gulper shark)
 Genus Deania Jordan & Snyder, 1902
 Deania calcea (Lowe, 1839) (Bird-beak dogfish)
 Deania hystricosa (Garman, 1906) (Rough longnose dogfish)
 Deania profundorum (Smith & Radcliffe, 1912) (Arrow-head dogfish)
 Deania quadrispinosa (McCulloch, 1915) (Long-snout dogfish)
 Family Echinorhinidae Gill 1862 (bramble/spinous sharks)
 Genus Echinorhinus Gill, 1862
 Echinorhinus brucus (Bonnaterre, 1788) (Bramble shark)
 Echinorhinus cookei Pietschmann, 1928 (Prickly shark)
 Family Etmopteridae Fowler 1934 (lantern sharks)
 Genus Aculeola F. de Buen, 1959
 Aculeola nigra F. de Buen, 1959 (Hook-tooth dogfish)
 Genus Centroscyllium J. P. Müller & Henle, 1841
 Centroscyllium excelsum Shirai & Nakaya, 1990 (High-fin dogfish)
 Centroscyllium fabricii (J. C. H. Reinhardt, 1825) (Black dogfish)
 Centroscyllium granulatum Günther, 1887 (Granular dogfish)
 Centroscyllium kamoharai T. Abe, 1966 (Bare-skin dogfish)
 Centroscyllium nigrum Garman, 1899 (Comb-tooth dogfish)
 Centroscyllium ornatum (Alcock, 1889) (Ornate dogfish)
 Centroscyllium ritteri D. S. Jordan & Fowler, 1903 (White-fin dogfish)
 Genus Etmopterus Rafinesque, 1810
 Etmopterus baxteri Garrick, 1957 (New Zealand lanternshark)
 Etmopterus benchleyi V. E. Vásquez, Ebert & Long, 2015 (Ninja lanternshark)
 Etmopterus bigelowi Shirai & Tachikawa, 1993 (Blurred lanternshark)
 Etmopterus brachyurus H. M. Smith & Radcliffe, 1912 (Short-tail lanternshark)
 Etmopterus bullisi Bigelow & Schroeder, 1957 (Lined lanternshark)
 Etmopterus burgessi Schaaf-Da Silva & Ebert, 2006 (Broad-snout lanternshark)
 Etmopterus carteri S. Springer & G. H. Burgess, 1985 (Cylindrical lanternshark)
 Etmopterus caudistigmus Last, G. H. Burgess & Séret, 2002 (Tail-spot lanternshark)
 Etmopterus compagnoi R. Fricke & Koch, 1990 (Brown lanternshark)
 Etmopterus decacuspidatus W. L. Y. Chan, 1966 (Comb-tooth lanternshark)
 Etmopterus dianthus Last, G. H. Burgess & Séret, 2002 (Pink lanternshark)
 Etmopterus dislineatus Last, G. H. Burgess & Séret, 2002 (Lined lanternshark)
 Etmopterus evansi Last, G. H. Burgess & Séret, 2002 (Black-mouth lanternshark)
 Etmopterus fusus Last, G. H. Burgess & Séret, 2002 (Pygmy lanternshark)
 Etmopterus gracilispinis G. Krefft, 1968 (Broad-banded lanternshark)
 Etmopterus granulosus (Günther, 1880) (Southern lanternshark)
 Etmopterus hillianus (Poey, 1861) (Caribbean lanternshark)
 Etmopterus joungi Knuckey, Ebert & G. H. Burgess, 2011 (Short-fin smooth lanternshark)
 Etmopterus litvinovi Parin & Kotlyar, 1990 (Small-eye lanternshark)
 Etmopterus lucifer D. S. Jordan & Snyder, 1902 (Black-belly lanternshark)
 Etmopterus molleri (Whitley, 1939) (Moller's lanternshark)
 Etmopterus perryi S. Springer & G. H. Burgess, 1985 (Dwarf lanternshark)
 Etmopterus polli Bigelow, Schroeder & S. Springer, 1953 (African lanternshark)
 Etmopterus princeps Collett, 1904 (Great lanternshark)
 Etmopterus pseudosqualiolus Last, G. H. Burgess & Séret, 2002 (False lanternshark)
 Etmopterus pusillus (R. T. Lowe, 1839) (Smooth lanternshark)
 Etmopterus pycnolepis Kotlyar, 1990 (Dense-scale lanternshark)
 Etmopterus robinsi Schofield & G. H. Burgess, 1997 (West Indian lanternshark)
 Etmopterus schultzi Bigelow, Schroeder & S. Springer, 1953 (Fringe-fin lanternshark)
 Etmopterus sculptus Ebert, L. J. V. Compagno & De Vries, 2011 (Sculpted lanternshark)
 Etmopterus sentosus Bass, D'Aubrey & Kistnasamy, 1976 (Thorny lanternshark)
 Etmopterus sheikoi (Dolganov, 1986) (Rasp-tooth dogfish)
 Etmopterus spinax (Linnaeus, 1758) (Velvet-belly lanternshark)
 Etmopterus splendidus Ka. Yano, 1988 (Splendid lanternshark)
 Etmopterus unicolor (Engelhardt, 1912) (Bristled lanternshark)
 Etmopterus viator Straube, 2011 (Traveller lanternshark)
 Etmopterus villosus C. H. Gilbert, 1905 (Hawaiian lanternshark)
 Etmopterus virens Bigelow, Schroeder & S. Springer, 1953 (Green lanternshark)
 Etmopterus sp. Not yet described (Guadalupe lanternshark)
 Etmopterus sp. Not yet described (Chilean lanternshark)
 Etmopterus sp. Not yet described (Papua short-tail lanternshark)
 Genus Trigonognathus Mochizuki & F. Ohe, 1990
 Trigonognathus kabeyai Mochizuki & F. Ohe, 1990 (Viper dogfish)
 Family Oxynotidae Gill 1863 (Rough sharks)
 Genus Oxynotus Rafinesque, 1810
 Oxynotus bruniensis (J. D. Ogilby, 1893) (Prickly dogfish)
 Oxynotus caribbaeus Cervigón, 1961 (Caribbean roughshark)
 Oxynotus centrina (Linnaeus, 1758) (Angular roughshark)
 Oxynotus japonicus Ka. Yano & Murofushi, 1985 (Japanese roughshark)
 Oxynotus paradoxus Frade, 1929 (Sail-fin roughshark)
 Family Somniosidae Jordan 1888 (sleeper sharks)
 Genus Centroscymnus Barbosa du Bocage & Brito Capello, 1864
 Centroscymnus coelolepis Barbosa du Bocage & Brito Capello, 1864 (Portuguese dogfish)
 Centroscymnus owstonii Garman, 1906 (Rough-skin dogfish)
 Genus Centroselachus Garman, 1913
 Centroselachus crepidater (Barbosa du Bocage & Brito Capello, 1864) (Long-nose velvet dogfish)
 Genus Scymnodalatias Garrick, 1956
 Scymnodalatias albicauda Taniuchi & Garrick, 1986 (White-tail dogfish)
 Scymnodalatias garricki Kukuev & Konovalenko, 1988 (Azores dogfish)
 Scymnodalatias oligodon Kukuev & Konovalenko, 1988 (Sparse-tooth dogfish)
 Scymnodalatias sherwoodi (Archey, 1921) (Sherwood's dogfish)
 Genus Scymnodon Barbosa du Bocage & Brito Capello, 1864
 Scymnodon ichiharai Ka. Yano & S. Tanaka (II), 1984 (Japanese velvet dogfish)
 Scymnodon macracanthus (Regan, 1906) (Large-spine velvet dogfish)
 Scymnodon plunketi (Waite, 1910) (Plunket's shark)
 Scymnodon ringens Barbosa du Bocage & Brito Capello, 1864 (Knife-tooth dogfish)
 Genus Somniosus Lesueur, 1818
 Somniosus antarcticus Whitley, 1939 (Southern sleeper shark)
 Somniosus longus (S. Tanaka (I), 1912) (Frog shark)
 Somniosus microcephalus (Bloch & J. G. Schneider, 1801) (Greenland shark)
 Somniosus pacificus Bigelow & Schroeder, 1944 (Pacific sleeper shark)
 Somniosus rostratus (A. Risso, 1827) (Little sleeper shark)
 Somniosus sp. A Not yet described (Longnose sleeper shark)
 Genus Zameus D. S. Jordan & Fowler, 1903
 Zameus squamulosus (Günther, 1877) (Velvet dogfish)
 Family Dalatiidae Gray 1851 (Kitefin sharks)
 Genus Dalatias Rafinesque, 1810
 Dalatias licha (Bonnaterre, 1788) (Kitefin shark)
 Genus Euprotomicroides Hulley & M. J. Penrith, 1966
 Euprotomicroides zantedeschia Hulley & M. J. Penrith, 1966 (Tail-light shark)
 Genus Euprotomicrus T. N. Gill, 1865
 Euprotomicrus bispinatus (Quoy & Gaimard, 1824) (Pygmy shark)
 Genus Heteroscymnoides Fowler, 1934
 Heteroscymnoides marleyi Fowler, 1934 (Long-nose pygmy shark)
 Genus Isistius T. N. Gill, 1865
 Isistius brasiliensis (Quoy & Gaimard, 1824) (Cookie-cutter shark)
 Isistius plutodus Garrick & S. Springer, 1964 (Large-tooth cookiecutter shark)
 Genus Mollisquama Dolganov, 1984
 Mollisquama parini Dolganov, 1984 (Pocket shark)
 Genus Squaliolus H. M. Smith & Radcliffe, 1912
 Squaliolus aliae Teng, 1959 (Small-eye pygmy shark)
 Squaliolus laticaudus H. M. Smith & Radcliffe, 1912 (Spined pygmy shark)
 Family Squalidae de Blainville 1816 (dogfish sharks)
 Genus Cirrhigaleus S. Tanaka (I), 1912
 Cirrhigaleus asper (Merrett, 1973) (Rough-skin spurdog)
 Cirrhigaleus australis W. T. White, Last & J. D. Stevens, 2007 (Southern mandarin dogfish)
 Cirrhigaleus barbifer S. Tanaka (I), 1912 (Mandarin dogfish)
 Genus Squalus Linnaeus, 1758
 Squalus acanthias Linnaeus, 1758 (Spiny dogfish)
 Squalus acutipinnis Regan, 1908 (Blunt-nose spiny dogfish)
 Squalus albifrons Last, W. T. White & J. D. Stevens, 2007 (Eastern highfin spurdog)
 Squalus altipinnis Last, W. T. White & J. D. Stevens, 2007 (Western highfin spurdog)
 Squalus blainville (A. Risso, 1827) (Long-nose spurdog)
 Squalus brevirostris S. Tanaka (I), 1917 (Japanese shortnose spurdog)
 Squalus bucephalus Last, Séret & Pogonoski, 2007 (Big-head spurdog)
 Squalus chloroculus Last, W. T. White & Motomura, 2007 (Green-eye spurdog)
 Squalus crassispinus Last, Edmunds & Yearsley, 2007 (Fat-spine spurdog)
 Squalus cubensis Howell-Rivero, 1936 (Cuban dogfish)
 Squalus edmundsi W. T. White, Last & J. D. Stevens, 2007 (Edmund's spurdog)
 Squalus formosus W. T. White & Iglésias, 2011 (Taiwan spurdog)
 Squalus grahami W. T. White, Last & J. D. Stevens, 2007 (Eastern longnose spurdog)
 Squalus griffini Phillipps, 1931 (Northern spiny dogfish)
 Squalus hemipinnis W. T. White, Last & Yearsley, 2007 (Indonesian shortsnout spurdog)
 Squalus japonicus Ishikawa, 1908 (Japanese spurdog)
 Squalus lalannei Baranes, 2003 (Seychelles spurdog)
 Squalus megalops (W. J. Macleay, 1881) (Short-nose spurdog)
 Squalus melanurus Fourmanoir & Rivaton, 1979 (Black-tailed spurdog)
 Squalus mitsukurii D. S. Jordan & Snyder, 1903 (Short-spine spurdog)
 Squalus montalbani Whitley, 1931 (Indonesian greeneye spurdog)
 Squalus nasutus Last, L. J. Marshall & W. T. White, 2007 (Western longnose spurdog)
 Squalus notocaudatus Last, W. T. White & J. D. Stevens, 2007 (Bar-tail spurdog)
 Squalus rancureli  Fourmanoir & Rivaton, 1979 (Cyrano spurdog)
 Squalus raoulensis C. A. J. Duffy & Last, 2007 (Kermadec spiny dogfish)
 Squalus suckleyi (Girard, 1854) (Pacific spiny dogfish)
 Squalus sp. Not yet described (Lombok highfin spurdog)

Order Squatiniformes
 Family Squatinidae de Blainville 1816 (angel sharks)
 Genus Squatina A. M. C. Duméril, 1806
 Squatina aculeata G. Cuvier, 1829 (Saw-back angelshark)
 Squatina africana Regan, 1908 (African angelshark)
 Squatina albipunctata Last & W. T. White, 2008 (Eastern angelshark)
 Squatina argentina (Marini, 1930) (Argentine angelshark)
 Squatina armata (Philippi {Krumweide}, 1887) (Chilean angelshark)
 Squatina australis Regan, 1906 (Australian angelshark)
 Squatina caillieti J. H. Walsh, Ebert & L. J. V. Compagno, 2011 (Philippines angelshark)
 Squatina californica Ayres, 1859 (Pacific angelshark)
 Squatina dumeril Lesueur, 1818 (Atlantic angelshark)
 Squatina formosa S. C. Shen & W. H. Ting, 1972 (Taiwan angelshark)
 Squatina guggenheim Marini, 1936 (Angular angelshark)
 Squatina heteroptera Castro-Aguirre, Espinoza-Pérez & Huidobro-Campos, 2007 (Disparate angelshark)
 Squatina japonica Bleeker, 1858 (Japanese angelshark)
 Squatina legnota Last & W. T. White, 2008 (Indonesian angelshark)
 Squatina mexicana Castro-Aguirre, Espinoza-Pérez & Huidobro-Campos, 2007 (Mexican angelshark)
 Squatina nebulosa Regan, 1906 (Clouded angelshark)
 Squatina occulta Vooren & K. G. da Silva, 1992 (Hidden angelshark)
 Squatina oculata Bonaparte, 1840 (Smooth-back angelshark)
 Squatina pseudocellata Last & W. T. White, 2008 (Western angelshark)
 Squatina squatina (Linnaeus, 1758) (Angelshark)
 Squatina tergocellata McCulloch, 1914 (Ornate angelshark)
 Squatina tergocellatoides J. S. T. F. Chen, 1963 (Ocellated angelshark)

Order Pristiophoriformes
 Family Pristiophoridae Bleeker 1859 (saw sharks)
 Genus Pliotrema Regan, 1906
 Pliotrema warreni Regan, 1906  (Six-gill sawshark)
 Genus Pristiophorus J. P. Müller & Henle, 1837 
 Pristiophorus cirratus (Latham, 1794) (Long-nose sawshark)
 Pristiophorus delicatus Yearsley, Last & W. T. White, 2008 (Tropical sawshark)
 Pristiophorus japonicus Günther, 1870 (Japanese sawshark)
 Pristiophorus lanae Ebert & Wilms, 2013 (Lana's sawshark)
 Pristiophorus nancyae Ebert & Cailliet, 2011 (African dwarf sawshark)
 Pristiophorus nudipinnis Günther, 1870 (Short-nose sawshark)
 Pristiophorus schroederi S. Springer & Bullis, 1960 (Bahamas sawshark)

Superorder Galeomorphi

Order Heterodontiformes
 Family Heterodontidae Gray 1851 (bullhead sharks, horn sharks, Port Jackson sharks)
 Genus Heterodontus Blainville, 1816
 Heterodontus francisci (Girard, 1855) (Horn shark)
 Heterodontus galeatus (Günther, 1870) (Crested bullhead shark)
 Heterodontus japonicus Maclay & W. J. Macleay, 1884 (Japanese bullhead shark)
 Heterodontus mexicanus L. R. Taylor & Castro-Aguirre, 1972 (Mexican hornshark)
 Heterodontus omanensis Z. H. Baldwin, 2005 (Oman bullhead shark)
 Heterodontus portusjacksoni (F. A. A. Meyer, 1793) (Port Jackson shark)
 Heterodontus quoyi (Fréminville, 1840) (Galapagos bullhead shark)
 Heterodontus ramalheira (J. L. B. Smith, 1949) (White-spotted bullhead shark)
 Heterodontus zebra (J. E. Gray, 1831) (Zebra bullhead shark)
 Heterodontus sp. X Not yet described (Cryptic hornshark)

Order Orectolobiformes
 Family Parascylliidae Gill 1962 (collared carpet sharks)
 Genus Cirrhoscyllium H. M. Smith & Radcliffe, 1913
 Cirrhoscyllium expolitum H. M. Smith & Radcliffe, 1913 (Barbel-throat carpetshark)
 Cirrhoscyllium formosanum Teng, 1959 (Taiwan saddled carpetshark)
 Cirrhoscyllium japonicum Kamohara, 1943 (Saddle carpetshark)
 Genus Parascyllium T. N. Gill, 1862
 Parascyllium collare E. P. Ramsay & J. D. Ogilby, 1888 (Collared carpetshark)
 Parascyllium elongatum Last & J. D. Stevens, 2008 (Elongate carpetshark)
 Parascyllium ferrugineum McCulloch, 1911 (Rusty carpetshark)
 Parascyllium sparsimaculatum T. Goto & Last, 2002 (Ginger carpetshark)
 Parascyllium variolatum (A. H. A. Duméril, 1853) (Necklace carpetshark) 
 Family Brachaeluridae Applegate 1974 (blind sharks)
 Genus Brachaelurus J. D. Ogilby, 1908
 Brachaelurus colcloughi J. D. Ogilby, 1908 (Blue-grey carpetshark)
 Brachaelurus waddi (Bloch & J. G. Schneider, 1801) (Blind shark)
 Family Orectolobidae Gill 1896 [Crossorhinidae] (wobbegons)
 Genus Eucrossorhinus Regan, 1908
 Eucrossorhinus dasypogon (Bleeker, 1867) (Tasselled wobbegong)
 Genus Orectolobus Bonaparte, 1834
 Orectolobus floridus Last & Chidlow, 2008 (Floral banded wobbegong)
 Orectolobus halei Whitley, 1940 (Banded wobbegong)
 Orectolobus hutchinsi Last, Chidlow & L. J. V. Compagno, 2006 (Western wobbegong)
 Orectolobus japonicus Regan, 1906 (Japanese wobbegong)
 Orectolobus leptolineatus Last, Pogonoski & W. T. White, 2010 (Indonesian wobbegong)
 Orectolobus maculatus (Bonnaterre, 1788) (Spotted wobbegong)
 Orectolobus ornatus (De Vis, 1883) (Ornate wobbegong)
 Orectolobus parvimaculatus Last & Chidlow, 2008 (Dwarf-spotted wobbegong)
 Orectolobus reticulatus Last, Pogonoski & W. T. White, 2008 (Network wobbegong)
 Orectolobus wardi Whitley, 1939 (Northern wobbegong)
 Genus Sutorectus Whitley, 1939
 Sutorectus tentaculatus (W. K. H. Peters, 1864) (Cobbler wobbegong)
 Family Hemiscylliidae Gill 1862 (bamboo sharks)
 Genus Chiloscyllium J. P. Müller & Henle, 1837
 Chiloscyllium arabicum Gubanov, 1980 (Arabian carpetshark)
 Chiloscyllium burmensis Dingerkus & DeFino, 1983 (Burmese bamboo shark)
 Chiloscyllium griseum J. P. Müller & Henle, 1838 (Grey bamboo shark)
 Chiloscyllium hasselti Bleeker, 1852 (Hasselt's bamboo shark)
 Chiloscyllium indicum (J. F. Gmelin, 1789) (Slender bamboo shark)
 Chiloscyllium plagiosum (Anonymous, referred to E. T. Bennett, 1830) (White-spotted bamboo shark)
 Chiloscyllium punctatum J. P. Müller & Henle, 1838 (Brown-banded bamboo shark)
 Genus Hemiscyllium J. P. Müller & Henle, 1837
 Hemiscyllium freycineti (Quoy & Gaimard, 1824) (Indonesian speckled carpetshark)
 Hemiscyllium galei G. R. Allen & Erdmann, 2008 (Cenderawasih epaulette shark)
 Hemiscyllium hallstromi Whitley, 1967 (Papuan epaulette shark)
 Hemiscyllium halmahera G. R. Allen, Erdmann & Dudgeon, 2013 (Halmahera epaulette shark)
 Hemiscyllium henryi G. R. Allen & Erdmann, 2008 (Triton epaulette shark)
 Hemiscyllium michaeli G. R. Allen & Dudgeon, 2010 (Leopard epaulette shark)
 Hemiscyllium ocellatum (Bonnaterre, 1788) (Epaulette shark)
 Hemiscyllium strahani Whitley, 1967 (Hooded carpetshark)
 Hemiscyllium trispeculare J. Richardson, 1843 (Speckled carpetshark)
 Hemiscyllium sp. Not yet described (Seychelles carpetshark)
 Family Ginglymostomatidae Gill 1862 (nurse sharks)
 Genus Ginglymostoma J. P. Müller & Henle, 1837
 Ginglymostoma cirratum (Bonnaterre, 1788) (Nurse shark)
 Ginglymostoma unami Del-Moral-Flores, Ramírez-Antonio, Angulo & Pérez-Ponce de León, 2015 (Pacific nurse shark)
 Genus Nebrius Rüppell, 1837
 Nebrius ferrugineus (Lesson, 1831) (Tawny nurse shark)
 Genus Pseudoginglymostoma Dingerkus, 1986
 Pseudoginglymostoma brevicaudatum (Günther, 1867) (Short-tail nurse shark)
 Family Rhincodontidae Müller & Henle 1841 (whale sharks)
 Genus Rhincodon A. Smith, 1828
 Rhincodon typus A. Smith, 1828 (Whale shark)
 Family Stegostomatidae Gill 1862 (zebra sharks)
 Genus Stegostoma J. P. Müller & Henle, 1837
 Stegostoma fasciatum (Hermann, 1783) (Zebra shark)

Order Lamniformes
 Family Mitsukurinidae Jordan 1898 (goblin sharks)
 Genus Mitsukurina D. S. Jordan, 1898
 Mitsukurina owstoni D. S. Jordan, 1898 (Goblin shark)
 Family Odontaspididae Müller & Henle 1839 (sand tigers)
 Genus Carcharias Rafinesque, 1810
 Carcharias taurus Rafinesque, 1810 (Sand-tiger shark) 
 Genus Odontaspis Agassiz, 1838
 Odontaspis ferox (A. Risso, 1810) (Small-tooth sandtiger shark) 
 Odontaspis noronhai (Maul, 1955) (Big-eye sandtiger shark)
 Family Alopiidae (Thresher sharks)
 Genus Alopias Rafinesque, 1810
 Alopias pelagicus Nakamura, 1935 (Pelagic thresher shark) 
 Alopias superciliosus R. T. Lowe, 1841 (Big-eye thresher shark) 
 Alopias vulpinus (Bonnaterre, 1788) (Thresher shark) 
 Family Pseudocarchariidae Taylor, Compagno & Struhsaker  (crocodile shark)
 Genus Pseudocarcharias Cadenat, 1963
 Pseudocarcharias kamoharai (Matsubara, 1936) (Crocodile shark)
 Family Megachasmidae Taylor, Compagno & Struhsaker 1983 megamouth sharks)
 Genus Megachasma L. R. Taylor, L. J. V. Compagno & Struhsaker, 1983
 Megachasma pelagios L. R. Taylor, L. J. V. Compagno & Struhsaker, 1983 (Megamouth shark)
 Family Cetorhinidae Gill 1862 (basking sharks)
 Genus Cetorhinus Blainville, 1816
 Cetorhinus maximus (Gunnerus, 1765) (Basking shark)
 Family Lamnidae Müller & Henle 1838 (blue sharks)
 Genus Carcharodon A. Smith, 1838
 Carcharodon carcharias (Linnaeus, 1758) (Great white shark) 
 Genus Isurus Rafinesque, 1810
 Isurus oxyrinchus Rafinesque, 1810 (Short-fin mako)
 Isurus paucus Guitart-Manday, 1966 (Long-fin mako) 
 Genus Lamna G. Cuvier, 1816
 Lamna ditropis C. L. Hubbs & Follett, 1947 (Salmon shark) 
 Lamna nasus (Bonnaterre, 1788) (Porbeagle shark)

Order Carcharhiniformes
 Family Scyliorhinidae Gill 1862 (catsharks)
 Genus Apristurus Garman, 1913
 Apristurus albisoma Nakaya & Séret, 1999 (White-bodied catshark)
 Apristurus ampliceps Sasahara, K. Sato & Nakaya, 2008 (Rough-skin catshark)
 Apristurus aphyodes Nakaya & Stehmann, 1998 (White ghost catshark)
 Apristurus australis K. Sato, Nakaya & Yorozu, 2008 (Pinocchio catshark)
 Apristurus breviventralis Kawauchi, Weigmann & Nakaya, 2014 (Short-belly catshark)
 Apristurus brunneus (C. H. Gilbert, 1892) (Brown catshark)
 Apristurus bucephalus W. T. White, Last & Pogonoski, 2008 (Big-head catshark)
 Apristurus canutus S. Springer & Heemstra, 1979 (Hoary catshark)
 Apristurus exsanguis K. Sato, Nakaya & A. L. Stewart, 1999 (Flaccid catshark)
 Apristurus fedorovi Dolganov, 1985 (Fedorov's catshark)
 Apristurus garricki K. Sato, A. L. Stewart & Nakaya, 2013 (Garrick's catshark)
 Apristurus gibbosus Q. W. Meng, Y. T. Chu & S. Li, 1985  (Humpback catshark)
 Apristurus herklotsi (Fowler, 1934) (Long-fin catshark)
 Apristurus indicus (A. B. Brauer, 1906) (Small-belly catshark)
 Apristurus internatus S. M. Deng, G. Q. Xiong & H. X. Zhan, 1988  (Short-nose demon catshark)
 Apristurus investigatoris (Misra, 1962) (Broad-nose catshark)
 Apristurus japonicus Nakaya, 1975 (Japanese catshark)
 Apristurus kampae L. R. Taylor, 1972 (Long-nose catshark)
 Apristurus laurussonii (Sæmundsson, 1922) (Iceland catshark)
 Apristurus longicephalus Nakaya, 1975 (Long-head catshark)
 Apristurus macrorhynchus (S. Tanaka (I), 1909) (Flat-head catshark)
 Apristurus macrostomus Q. W. Meng, Y. T. Chu & S. Li, 1985 (Broad-mouth catshark)
 Apristurus manis (S. Springer, 1979) (Ghost catshark)
 Apristurus melanoasper Iglésias, Nakaya & Stehmann, 2004 (Black roughscale catshark)
 Apristurus microps (Gilchrist, 1922) (Small-eye catshark)
 Apristurus micropterygeus Q. W. Meng, Y. T. Chu & S. Li, 1986 (Small-dorsal catshark)
 Apristurus nakayai Iglésias, 2013 (Milk-eye catshark)
 Apristurus nasutus F. de Buen, 1959 (Large-nose catshark)
 Apristurus parvipinnis S. Springer & Heemstra, 1979 (Small-fin catshark)
 Apristurus pinguis S. M. Deng, G. Q. Xiong & H. X. Zhan, 1983 (Fat catshark)
 Apristurus platyrhynchus (S. Tanaka (I), 1909) (Borneo catshark)
 Apristurus profundorum (Goode & T. H. Bean, 1896) (Deep-water catshark)
 Apristurus riveri Bigelow & Schroeder, 1944 (Broad-gill catshark)
 Apristurus saldanha (Barnard, 1925) (Saldanha catshark)
 Apristurus sibogae (M. C. W. Weber, 1913) (Pale catshark)
 Apristurus sinensis Y. T. Chu & A. S. Hu, 1981 (South China catshark)
 Apristurus spongiceps (C. H. Gilbert, 1905) (Sponge-head catshark)
 Apristurus stenseni (S. Springer, 1979) (Panama ghost catshark)
 Apristurus sp. X Not yet described (Galbraith's catshark)
 Apristurus sp. 3 Not yet described (Black wonder catshark)
 Genus Asymbolus Whitley, 1939
 Asymbolus analis (J. D. Ogilby, 1885) (Australian spotted catshark)
 Asymbolus funebris L. J. V. Compagno, J. D. Stevens & Last, 1999  (Blotched catshark)
 Asymbolus galacticus Séret & Last, 2008 (Starry catshark)
 Asymbolus occiduus Last, M. F. Gomon & Gledhill, 1999 (Western spotted catshark)
 Asymbolus pallidus Last, M. F. Gomon & Gledhill, 1999 (Pale spotted catshark)
 Asymbolus parvus L. J. V. Compagno, Stevens & Last, 1999 (Dwarf catshark)
 Asymbolus rubiginosus Last, M. F. Gomon & Gledhill, 1999 (Orange spotted catshark)
 Asymbolus submaculatus L. J. V. Compagno, J. D. Stevens & Last, 1999 (Variegated catshark)
 Asymbolus vincenti (Zietz (fi), 1908) (Gulf catshark)
 Genus Atelomycterus Garman, 1913
 Atelomycterus baliensis W. T. White, Last & Dharmadi, 2005 (Bali catshark)    
 Atelomycterus erdmanni Fahmi & W. T. White, 2015 (Spotted-belly catshark)
 Atelomycterus fasciatus L. J. V. Compagno & J. D. Stevens, 1993 (Banded sand catshark)
 Atelomycterus macleayi Whitley, 1939 (Australian marbled catshark)
 Atelomycterus marmoratus (Anonymous, referred to E. T. Bennett, 1830) (Coral catshark)
 Atelomycterus marnkalha Jacobsen & M. B. Bennett, 2007 (Eastern banded catshark)
 Genus Aulohalaelurus Fowler, 1934
 Aulohalaelurus kanakorum Séret, 1990 (Kanakorum catshark)
 Aulohalaelurus labiosus (Waite, 1905) (Australian black-spotted catshark)
 Genus Bythaelurus L. J. V. Compagno, 1988
 Bythaelurus alcockii (Garman, 1913) (Arabian catshark)
 Bythaelurus canescens (Günther, 1878) (Dusky catshark)
 Bythaelurus clevai (Séret, 1987) (Broad-head catshark)
 Bythaelurus dawsoni (S. Springer, 1971) (New Zealand catshark)
 Bythaelurus giddingsi J. E. McCosker, Long & C. C. Baldwin, 2012 (Galápagos catshark)
 Bythaelurus hispidus (Alcock, 1891) (Bristly catshark)
 Bythaelurus immaculatus (Y. T. Chu & Q. W. Meng, 1982) (Spot-less catshark)
 Bythaelurus incanus Last & J. D. Stevens, 2008 (Sombre catshark)
 Bythaelurus lutarius (S. Springer & D'Aubrey, 1972) (Mud catshark)
 Bythaelurus naylori Ebert & Clerkin, 2015 (Dusky-snout catshark)
 Bythaelurus tenuicephalus Kaschner, Weigmann & Thiel, 2015 (Narrow-head catshark)
 Genus Cephaloscyllium T. N. Gill, 1862
 Cephaloscyllium albipinnum Last, Motomura & W. T. White, 2008 (White-fin swellshark)
 Cephaloscyllium cooki Last, Séret & W. T. White, 2008 (Cook's swellshark)
 Cephaloscyllium fasciatum W. L. Y. Chan, 1966 (Reticulated swellshark)
 Cephaloscyllium formosanum Teng, 1962 (Formosa swellshark)
 Cephaloscyllium hiscosellum W. T. White & Ebert, 2008 (Australian reticulate swellshark)
 Cephaloscyllium isabellum (Bonnaterre, 1788) (Draughtsboard shark)
 Cephaloscyllium laticeps (A. H. A. Duméril, 1853) (Australian swellshark)
 Cephaloscyllium pictum Last, Séret & W. T. White, 2008 (Painted swellshark)
 Cephaloscyllium sarawakensis Ka. Yano, A. Ahmad & Gambang, 2005 (Sarawak pygmy swellshark)
 Cephaloscyllium signourum Last, Séret & W. T. White, 2008 (Flag-tail swellshark)
 Cephaloscyllium silasi (Talwar, 1974) (Indian swellshark)
 Cephaloscyllium speccum Last, Séret & W. T. White, 2008 (Speckled swellshark)
 Cephaloscyllium stevensi E. Clark & J. E. Randall, 2011 (Steven's swellshark)
 Cephaloscyllium sufflans (Regan, 1921) (Balloon shark)
 Cephaloscyllium umbratile D. S. Jordan & Fowler, 1903 (Blotchy swellshark)
 Cephaloscyllium variegatum Last & W. T. White, 2008 (Saddled swellshark)
 Cephaloscyllium ventriosum (Garman, 1880) (Swellshark)
 Cephaloscyllium zebrum Last & W. T. White, 2008 (Narrow-bar swellshark)
 Cephaloscyllium sp. 1 Not yet described (Philippines swellshark)
 Genus Cephalurus Bigelow & Schroeder, 1941
 Cephalurus cephalus (C. H. Gilbert, 1892) (Lollipop catshark)
 Cephalurus sp. A Not yet described (Southern lollipop catshark)
 Genus Figaro Whitley, 1928
 Figaro boardmani (Whitley, 1928) (Australian sawtail catshark)
 Figaro striatus Gledhill, Last & W. T. White, 2008 (Northern sawtail catshark)
 Genus Galeus G. Cuvier, 1816
 Galeus antillensis S. Springer, 1979  (Antilles catshark)
 Galeus arae (Nichols, 1927) (Rough-tail catshark)
 Galeus atlanticus (Vaillant, 1888) (Atlantic sawtail catshark)
 Galeus cadenati S. Springer, 1966 (Long-fin sawtail catshark)
 Galeus eastmani (D. S. Jordan & Snyder, 1904) (Gecko catshark)
 Galeus gracilis L. J. V. Compagno & J. D. Stevens, 1993 (Slender sawtail catshark)
 Galeus longirostris Tachikawa & Taniuchi, 1987 (Long-nose sawtail catshark)
 Galeus melastomus Rafinesque, 1810 (Black-mouth catshark)
 Galeus mincaronei Soto, 2001 (Southern sawtail catshark)
 Galeus murinus (Collett, 1904) (Mouse catshark)
 Galeus nipponensis Nakaya, 1975 (Broad-fin sawtail catshark)
 Galeus piperatus S. Springer & M. H. Wagner, 1966 (Peppered catshark)
 Galeus polli Cadenat, 1959 (African sawtail catshark)
 Galeus priapus Séret & Last, 2008 (Phallic catshark)
 Galeus sauteri (D. S. Jordan & R. E. Richardson, 1909) (Black-tip sawtail catshark)
 Galeus schultzi S. Springer, 1979 (Dwarf sawtail catshark)
 Galeus springeri Konstantinou & Cozzi, 1998 (Springer's sawtail catshark)
 Genus Halaelurus T. N. Gill, 1862
 Halaelurus boesemani S. Springer & D'Aubrey, 1972 (Speckled catshark)
 Halaelurus buergeri (J. P. Müller & Henle, 1838) (Black-spotted catshark)
 Halaelurus lineatus Bass, D'Aubrey & Kistnasamy, 1975 (Lined catshark)
 Halaelurus maculosus W. T. White, Last & J. D. Stevens, 2007 (Indonesian speckled catshark)
 Halaelurus natalensis (Regan, 1904) (Tiger catshark)
 Halaelurus quagga (Alcock, 1899) (Quagga catshark)
 Halaelurus sellus W. T. White, Last & J. D. Stevens, 2007 (Rusty catshark)
 Genus Haploblepharus Garman, 1913
 Haploblepharus edwardsii (Schinz, 1822) (Puffadder shyshark)
 Haploblepharus fuscus J. L. B. Smith, 1950 (Brown shyshark)
Haploblepharus kistnasamyi Human & L. J. V. Compagno, 2006 (Natal shyshark)
 Haploblepharus pictus (J. P. Müller & Henle, 1838) (Dark shyshark)
 Genus Holohalaelurus Fowler, 1934
 Holohalaelurus favus Human, 2006 (Honey-comb catshark)
 Holohalaelurus grennian Human, 2006 (Grinning catshark)
 Holohalaelurus melanostigma (Norman, 1939) (Crying catshark)
 Holohalaelurus punctatus (Gilchrist, 1914) (White-spotted catshark)
 Holohalaelurus regani (Gilchrist, 1922) (Izak catshark)
 Genus Parmaturus Garman, 1906
 Parmaturus albimarginatus Séret & Last, 2007 (White-tip catshark)
 Parmaturus albipenis Séret & Last, 2007 (White-clasper catshark)
 Parmaturus bigus Séret & Last, 2007 (Beige catshark)
 Parmaturus campechiensis S. Springer, 1979 (Campeche catshark)
 Parmaturus lanatus Séret & Last, 2007 (Velvet catshark)
 Parmaturus macmillani Hardy, 1985 (McMillan's catshark)
 Parmaturus melanobranchius (W. L. Y. Chan, 1966) (Black-gill catshark)
 Parmaturus pilosus Garman, 1906 (Salamander catshark)
 Parmaturus xaniurus (C. H. Gilbert, 1892) (File-tail catshark)
 Parmaturus sp. Not yet described (Rough-back catshark)
 Parmaturus sp. Not yet described (Indonesian filetail catshark)
 Parmaturus sp. Not yet described (Gulf of Mexico filetail catshark)
 Genus Poroderma A. Smith, 1838
 Poroderma africanum (J. F. Gmelin, 1789) (Striped catshark)
 Poroderma pantherinum (J. P. Müller & Henle, 1838) (Leopard catshark)
 Genus Schroederichthys A. Smith, 1838
 Schroederichthys bivius (J. P. Müller & Henle, 1838) (Narrow-mouthed catshark)
 Schroederichthys chilensis (Guichenot, 1848) (Red-spotted catshark)
 Schroederichthys maculatus S. Springer, 1966 (Narrow-tail catshark)
 Schroederichthys saurisqualus Soto, 2001 (Lizard catshark)
 Schroederichthys tenuis S. Springer, 1966 (Slender catshark)
 Genus Scyliorhinus Blainville, 1816
 Scyliorhinus boa Goode & T. H. Bean, 1896 (Boa catshark)
 Scyliorhinus cabofriensis K. D. A. Soares, U. L. Gomes & M. R. de Carvalho, 2016
 Scyliorhinus canicula (Linnaeus, 1758) (Lesser-spotted catshark)
 Scyliorhinus capensis (J. P. Müller & Henle, 1838) (Yellow-spotted catshark)
 Scyliorhinus cervigoni Maurin & M. Bonnet, 1970 (West African catshark)
 Scyliorhinus comoroensis L. J. V. Compagno, 1988 (Comoro catshark)
 Scyliorhinus garmani (Fowler, 1934) (Brown-spotted catshark)
 Scyliorhinus haeckelii (A. Miranda-Ribeiro, 1907) (Freckled catshark)
 Scyliorhinus hesperius S. Springer, 1966 (White-saddled catshark)
 Scyliorhinus meadi S. Springer, 1966 (Blotched catshark)
 Scyliorhinus retifer (Garman, 1881) (Chain catshark)
 Scyliorhinus stellaris (Linnaeus, 1758) (Nursehound)
 Scyliorhinus tokubee Shirai, S. Hagiwara & Nakaya, 1992 (Izu catshark)
 Scyliorhinus torazame (S. Tanaka (I), 1908) (Cloudy catshark)
 Scyliorhinus torrei Howell-Rivero, 1936 (Dwarf catshark)
 Scyliorhinus ugoi K. D. A. Soares, Gadig & U. L. Gomes, 2015 (Dark freckled catshark) 
 Scyliorhinus sp. X Not yet described (Oakley's catshark)
 Family Proscylliidae Fowler 1941 (finback catsharks)
 Genus Ctenacis L. J. V. Compagno, 1973
 Ctenacis fehlmanni (S. Springer, 1968) (Harlequin catshark)
 Genus Eridacnis H. M. Smith, 1913
 Eridacnis barbouri (Bigelow & Schroeder, 1944) (Cuban ribbontail catshark)
 Eridacnis radcliffei H. M. Smith, 1913 (Pygmy ribbontail catshark)
 Eridacnis sinuans (J. L. B. Smith, 1957) (African ribbontail catshark)
 Eridacnis sp. 1 Not yet described (Philippines ribbontail catshark)
 Genus Proscyllium Hilgendorf, 1904
 Proscyllium habereri Hilgendorf, 1904 (Graceful catshark)
 Proscyllium magnificum Last & Vongpanich, 2004 (Magnificent catshark)
 Family Pentanchidae Smith 1912 (deepwater catsharks)
 Genus Pentanchus H. M. Smith & Radcliffe, 1912
 Pentanchus profundicolus H. M. Smith & Radcliffe, 1912  (One-fin catshark)
 Family Pseudotriakidae Gill 1893 (false cat sharks)
 Genus Gollum L. J. V. Compagno, 1973
 Gollum attenuatus (Garrick, 1954) (Slender smooth-hound)
 Gollum suluensis Last & Gaudiano, 2011 (Sulu gollumshark)
 Gollum sp. B Not yet described (White-marked gollumshark)
 Genus Planonasus Weigmann, Stehmann & Thiel, 2013
 Planonasus parini Weigmann, Stehmann & Thiel, 2013 (Dwarf false catshark)
 Genus Pseudotriakis Brito Capello, 1868
 Pseudotriakis microdon Brito Capello, 1868 (False catshark)
 Family Triakidae Gray 1851 (hound sharks)
 Genus Furgaleus Whitley, 1951
 Furgaleus macki (Whitley, 1943)  (Whiskery shark)
 Genus Galeorhinus Blainville, 1816
 Galeorhinus galeus (Linnaeus, 1758) (Tope shark)
 Genus Gogolia L. J. V. Compagno, 1973
 Gogolia filewoodi L. J. V. Compagno, 1973 (Sail-back houndshark)
 Genus Hemitriakis Herre, 1923
 Hemitriakis abdita L. J. V. Compagno & J. D. Stevens, 1993 (Deep-water sicklefin houndshark)
 Hemitriakis complicofasciata T. Takahashi & Nakaya, 2004 (Ocellate topeshark)
 Hemitriakis falcata L. J. V. Compagno & J. D. Stevens, 1993 (Sickle-fin houndshark)
 Hemitriakis indroyonoi W. T. White, L. J. V. Compagno & Dharmadi, 2009 (Indonesian houndshark)
 Hemitriakis japanica (J. P. Müller & Henle, 1839) (Japanese topeshark)
 Hemitriakis leucoperiptera Herre, 1923 (White-fin topeshark)
 Genus Hypogaleus J. L. B. Smith, 1957
 Hypogaleus hyugaensis (Miyosi, 1939) (Black-tip tope)
 Genus Iago L. J. V. Compagno & S. Springer, 1971
 Iago garricki Fourmanoir & Rivaton, 1979 (Long-nose houndshark)
 Iago omanensis (Norman, 1939) (Big-eye houndshark)
 Genus Mustelus H. F. Linck, 1790
 Mustelus albipinnis Castro-Aguirre, Antuna-Mendiola, González-Acosta & De La Cruz-Agüero, 2005 (White-margin fin houndshark)
 Mustelus antarcticus Günther, 1870 (Gummy shark)
 Mustelus asterias Cloquet, 1821 (Starry smooth-hound)
 Mustelus californicus T. N. Gill, 1864 (Grey smooth-hound)
 Mustelus canis (Mitchill, 1815) 
 M. c. canis (Mitchill, 1815) (Dusky smooth-hound)
 M. c. insularis Heemstra, 1997 (Caribbean smooth-hound)
 Mustelus dorsalis T. N. Gill, 1864 (Sharp-tooth smooth-hound)
 Mustelus fasciatus (Garman, 1913) (Striped smooth-hound)
 Mustelus griseus Pietschmann, 1908 (Spot-less smooth-hound)
 Mustelus henlei (T. N. Gill, 1863) (Brown smooth-hound)
 Mustelus higmani S. Springer & R. H. Lowe, 1963 (Small-eye smooth-hound)
 Mustelus lenticulatus Phillipps, 1932 (Spotted estuary smooth-hound)
 Mustelus lunulatus D. S. Jordan & C. H. Gilbert, 1882 (Sickle-fin smooth-hound)
 Mustelus manazo Bleeker, 1854 (Star-spotted smooth-hound)
 Mustelus mangalorensis Cubelio, Remya R & Kurup, 2011 (Mangalore houndshark)
 Mustelus mento Cope, 1877 (Speckled smooth-hound)
 Mustelus minicanis Heemstra, 1997 (Dwarf smooth-hound)
 Mustelus mosis Hemprich & Ehrenberg, 1899 (Arabian smooth-hound)
 Mustelus mustelus (Linnaeus, 1758) (Common smooth-hound)
 Mustelus norrisi S. Springer, 1939 (Narrow-fin smooth-hound)
 Mustelus palumbes J. L. B. Smith, 1957 (White-spotted smooth-hound)
 Mustelus punctulatus A. Risso, 1827 (Black-spotted smooth-hound)
 Mustelus ravidus W. T. White & Last, 2006 (Australian grey smooth-hound)
 Mustelus schmitti S. Springer, 1939 (Narrow-nose smooth-hound)
 Mustelus sinusmexicanus Heemstra, 1997 (Gulf smooth-hound)
 Mustelus stevensi W. T. White & Last, 2008 (Western spotted gummy shark)
 Mustelus walkeri W. T. White & Last, 2008 (Eastern spotted gummy shark)
 Mustelus whitneyi Chirichigno F., 1973 (Humpback smooth-hound)
 Mustelus widodoi W. T. White & Last, 2006 (White-fin smooth-hound)
 Mustelus sp. Not yet described (Sarawak smooth-hound)
 Mustelus sp. Not yet described (Kermadec smooth-hound)
 Genus Scylliogaleus Boulenger, 1902
 Scylliogaleus quecketti Boulenger, 1902 (Flap-nose houndshark)
 Genus Triakis J. P. Müller & Henle, 1838
 Triakis acutipinna Kato, 1968 (Sharp-fin houndshark)
 Triakis maculata Kner & Steindachner, 1867 (Spotted houndshark)
 Triakis megalopterus (A. Smith, 1839) (Sharp-tooth houndshark)
 Triakis scyllium J. P. Müller & Henle, 1839 (Banded houndshark)
 Triakis semifasciata Girard, 1855 (Leopard shark)
 Family Leptochariidae Gray 1851 (barbeled houndsharks)
 Genus Leptocharias A. Smith, 1838
 Leptocharias smithii (J. P. Müller & Henle, 1839)  (Barbeled houndshark)
 Family Hemigaleidae Hasse 1878 (weasel sharks)
 Genus Chaenogaleus T. N. Gill, 1862
 Chaenogaleus macrostoma (Bleeker, 1852) (Hook-tooth shark)
 Genus Hemigaleus Bleeker, 1852
 Hemigaleus australiensis W. T. White, Last & L. J. V. Compagno, 2005 (Australian weasel shark) 
 Hemigaleus microstoma Bleeker, 1852 (Sickle-fin weasel shark) 
 Genus Hemipristis Agassiz, 1843
 Hemipristis elongata (Klunzinger, 1871) (Snaggle-tooth shark)
 Genus Paragaleus Budker, 1935
 Paragaleus leucolomatus L. J. V. Compagno & Smale, 1985 (White-tip weasel shark) 
 Paragaleus pectoralis (Garman, 1906) (Atlantic weasel shark)
 Paragaleus randalli L. J. V. Compagno, Krupp & K. E. Carpenter, 1996 (Slender weasel shark) 
Paragaleus tengi (J. S. T. F. Chen, 1963) (Straight-tooth weasel shark) 
 Family Carcharhinidae Jordan & Evermann 1896 (requiem sharks)
 Genus Carcharhinus Blainville, 1816
 Carcharhinus acronotus (Poey, 1860) (Black-nose shark)
 Carcharhinus albimarginatus (Rüppell, 1837) (Silver-tip shark)
 Carcharhinus altimus (S. Springer, 1950) (Big-nose shark)
 Carcharhinus amblyrhynchoides (Whitley, 1934) (Graceful shark)
 Carcharhinus amblyrhynchos (Bleeker, 1856) (Black-tail reef shark)
 Carcharhinus amboinensis (J. P. Müller & Henle, 1839) (Pig-eye shark)
 Carcharhinus borneensis (Bleeker, 1858) (Borneo shark)
 Carcharhinus brachyurus (Günther, 1870) (Copper shark)
 Carcharhinus brevipinna (J. P. Müller & Henle, 1839) (Spinner shark)
 Carcharhinus cautus (Whitley, 1945) (Nervous shark)
 Carcharhinus cerdale C. H. Gilbert, 1898 (Pacific smalltail shark)
 Carcharhinus coatesi (Whitley, 1939) (Coates' shark)
 Carcharhinus dussumieri (J. P. Müller & Henle, 1839) (White-cheek shark)
 Carcharhinus falciformis (J. P. Müller & Henle, 1839) (Silky shark)
 Carcharhinus fitzroyensis (Whitley, 1943) (Creek whaler)
 Carcharhinus galapagensis (Snodgrass & Heller, 1905) (Galapagos shark)
 Carcharhinus hemiodon (J. P. Müller & Henle, 1839) (Pondicherry shark)
 Carcharhinus humani W. T. White & Weigmann, 2014 (Human's whaler shark)
 Carcharhinus isodon (J. P. Müller & Henle, 1839) (Fine-tooth shark)
 Carcharhinus leiodon Garrick, 1985 (Smooth-tooth blacktip shark)
 Carcharhinus leucas (J. P. Müller & Henle, 1839) (Bull shark)
 Carcharhinus limbatus (J. P. Müller & Henle, 1839) (Black-tip shark)
 Carcharhinus longimanus (Poey, 1861) (Oceanic whitetip shark)
 Carcharhinus macloti (J. P. Müller & Henle, 1839) (Hard-nose shark)
 Carcharhinus melanopterus (Quoy & Gaimard, 1824) (Black-tip reef shark)
 Carcharhinus obscurus (Lesueur, 1818) (Dusky shark)
 Carcharhinus perezi (Poey, 1876) (Caribbean reef shark)
 Carcharhinus plumbeus (Nardo, 1827) (Sandbar shark)
 Carcharhinus porosus (Ranzani, 1839) (Small-tail shark)
 Carcharhinus sealei (Pietschmann, 1913) (Black-spot shark)
 Carcharhinus signatus (Poey, 1868) (Night shark)
 Carcharhinus sorrah (J. P. Müller & Henle, 1839) (Spot-tail shark)
 Carcharhinus tilstoni (Whitley, 1950) (Australian blacktip shark)
 Carcharhinus tjutjot (Bleeker, 1852) (Indonesian whaler shark)
 Carcharhinus sp. A Not yet described  (False smalltail shark)
 Genus Galeocerdo J. P. Müller & Henle, 1837
 Galeocerdo cuvier (Péron & Lesueur, 1822) (Tiger shark)
 Genus Glyphis Agassiz, 1843
 Glyphis gangeticus (J. P. Müller & Henle, 1839) (Ganges shark)
 Glyphis garricki L. J. V. Compagno, W. T. White & Last, 2008 (Northern river shark)
 Glyphis glyphis (J. P. Müller & Henle, 1839) (Spear-tooth shark)
 Glyphis sp. Not yet described (Mukah river shark)
 Genus Isogomphodon T. N. Gill, 1862
 Isogomphodon oxyrhynchus (J. P. Müller & Henle, 1839) (Dagger-nose shark)
 Genus Lamiopsis T. N. Gill, 1862
 Lamiopsis temmincki (J. P. Müller & Henle, 1839) (Broad-fin shark)
 Lamiopsis tephrodes (Fowler, 1905) (Borneo broadfin shark)
 Genus Loxodon J. P. Müller & Henle, 1839
 Loxodon macrorhinus J. P. Müller & Henle, 1839 (Slit-eye shark)
 Genus Nasolamia L. J. V. Compagno & Garrick, 1983
 Nasolamia velox (C. H. Gilbert, 1898) (White-nose shark)
 Genus Negaprion Whitley, 1940
 Negaprion acutidens (Rüppell, 1837) (Sickle-fin lemon shark)
 Negaprion brevirostris (Poey, 1868) (Lemon shark)
 Genus Prionace Cantor, 1849
 Prionace glauca (Linnaeus, 1758) (Blue shark)
 Genus Rhizoprionodon Whitley, 1929
 Rhizoprionodon acutus (Rüppell, 1837) (Milk shark)
 Rhizoprionodon lalandii (J. P. Müller & Henle, 1839) (Brazilian sharpnose shark)
 Rhizoprionodon longurio (D. S. Jordan & C. H. Gilbert, 1882) (Pacific sharpnose shark)
 Rhizoprionodon oligolinx V. G. Springer, 1964 (Grey sharpnose shark)
 Rhizoprionodon porosus (Poey, 1861) (Caribbean sharpnose shark)
 Rhizoprionodon taylori (J. D. Ogilby, 1915) (Australian sharpnose shark)
 Rhizoprionodon terraenovae (J. Richardson, 1836) (Atlantic sharpnose shark)
 Genus Scoliodon J. P. Müller & Henle, 1838
 Scoliodon laticaudus J. P. Müller & Henle, 1838 (Spade-nose shark)
 Scoliodon macrorhynchos (Bleeker, 1852) (Pacific spadenose shark)
 Genus Triaenodon J. P. Müller & Henle, 1837
 Triaenodon obesus (Rüppell, 1837) (White-tip reef shark)

See also
 Chondrichthyes
 List of prehistoric cartilaginous fish
 List of sharks
 List of fishes
 Largest organisms
 Threatened rays
 Threatened sharks
 Cartilage
 Fish
 Animals

References

Lists of fishes